= Tomaž Planina =

Slovenian cave photographer, speleologist, and botanist

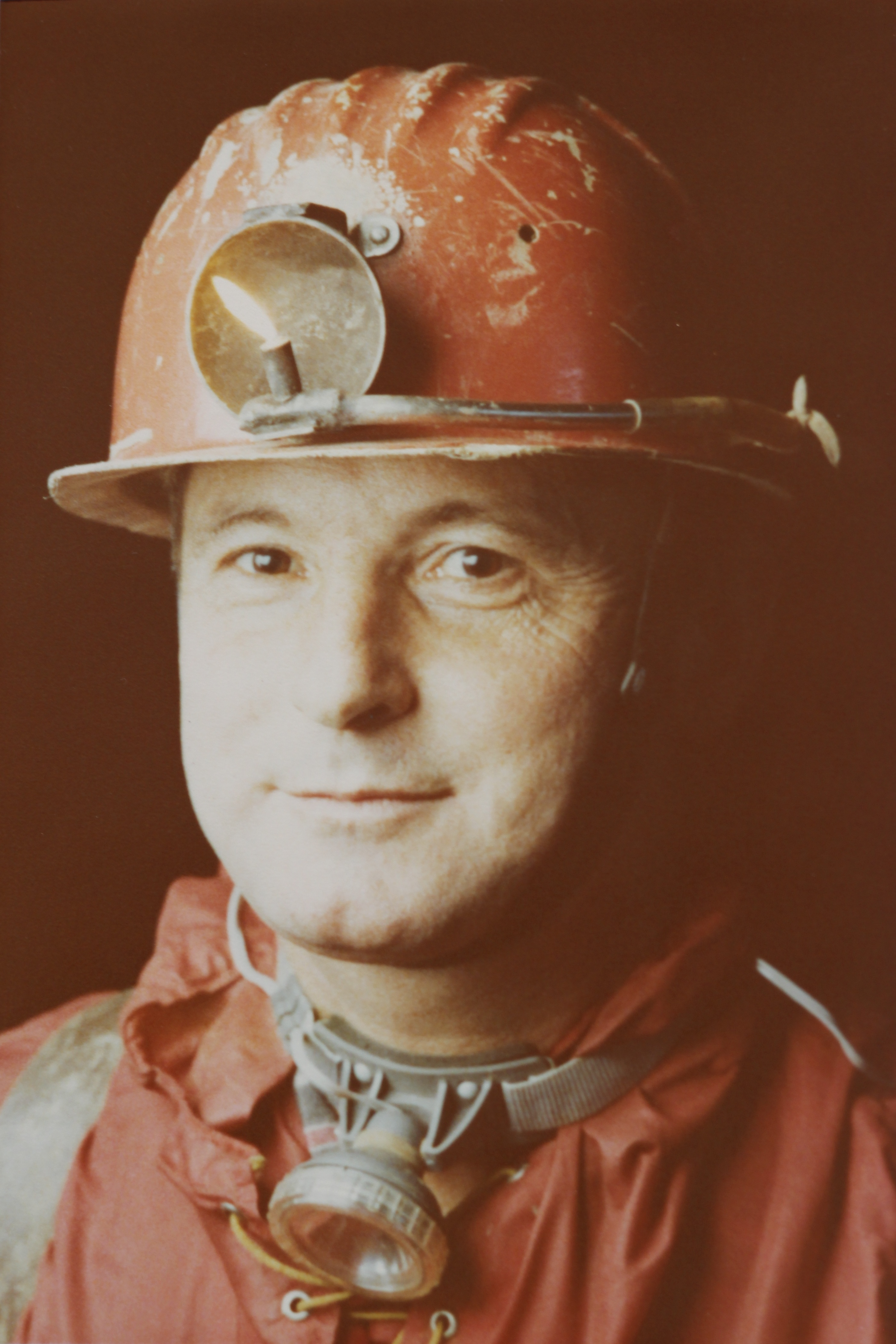
- Planina in 1981
- Born: 17 March 1934; Škofja Loka
- Died: 31 December 2014 (aged 80); Laško
- Education: University of Ljubljana
- Occupation: biologist
- Known for: cave photography, speleology
- Spouse: Metka Planina b. Benedičič (m. 1957; died 2006)
- Children: Polonica (1961) and Aleš (1966)

Tomaž Planina ([tomáž planína, pron. tomazh pluneenah], 17 March 1934 – 31 December 2014) was a Slovenian cave photographer, speleologist, and botanist. He was most known for his work in cave photography, laboratory rope testing, especially in connection to knots, and his contribution to the development of the single-rope technique.

== Early life, education and career ==
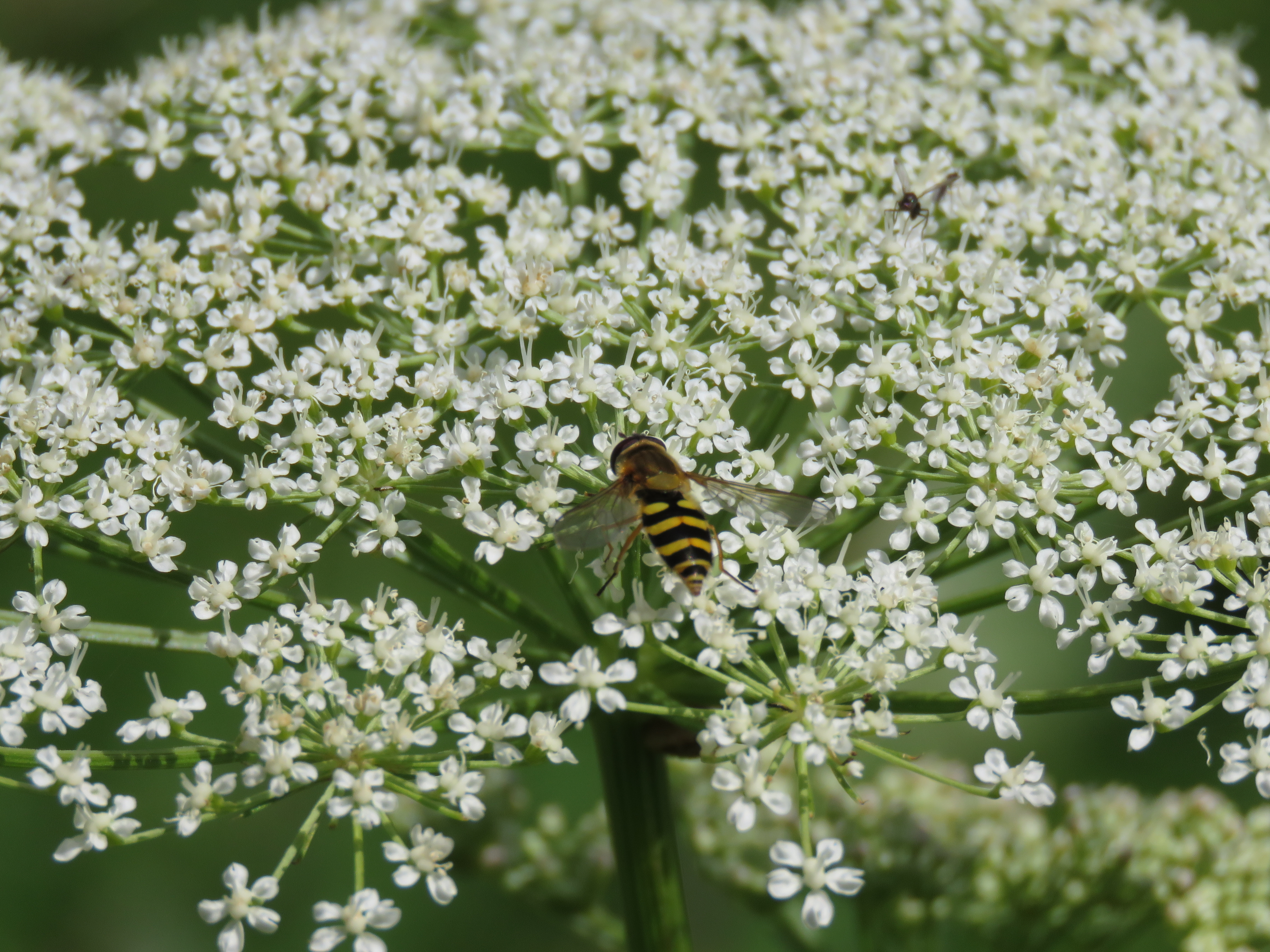
Ligusticum seguieri with a hover fly

Planina was born in Škofja Loka, into the family of France Planina, a geographer, cartographer, biologist, director of the Slovenian Museum of Natural History and Marinka Planina. After elementary and middle school in Ljubljana where the family moved, he graduated from the Faculty of Biology of the University of Ljubljana, in 1957. The title of his diploma thesis was Ligusticum seguieri v jugovzhodnih apneniških Alpah [Ligusticum seguieri in the south-eastern limestone Alps] – a Licorice root plant from the Apiaceae family. Despite Planina's achievements in botany, his herbarium was widely known, he decided not to pursue an academic career but took a job in the Development and Technology Center of the Iskra electronics and automation company where he specialized in the area of biologically and air-pollution based corrosion of electrical contacts. He worked in various capacities, including the post of research project leader and this field remained his occupation all his professional life.

== Speleology ==
Field trips to caves of the high school science club, organized by the pioneer of caving in Slovenia, Pavel Kunaver, were very popular and it is what made Planina interested in caves. He joined DZRJL, Ljubljana Cave Exploration Society, in 1950, at the age of 16, and in 1954 made his first contribution to the Slovenian Cave Registry, three new caves above Vrhnika. Till 1992 he registered 51 new caves, mostly in lowland karst.

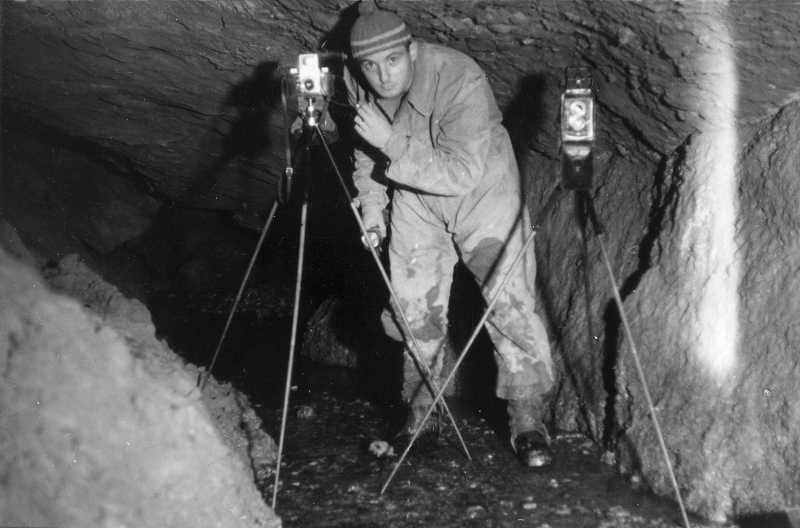
Planina during a cave photo session, 1960

From 1953 to 1956 Planina participated in the first explorations of high-mountain karst, on Mali podi plateau below Mt. Skuta in the Kamnik Alps. In the following years, he also joined several expeditions to the cave Triglavsko brezno on Mt. Triglav plateau, elevation 2,377 m, where the expectations of great depth were stopped by an impassable ice choke at a depth of 274 m. Together with Jože Štirn he wrote a review article about high mountain karst which was published after his death. In the mid-1960s there was a change of generations at Ljubljana Cave Exploration Society, pre-WWII team gave way to younger cavers. It was immediately reflected in a more ambitious agenda, emboldened by great success in 1963 when a small group of young members broke through a narrow passage at the end of the cave Najdena jama [Newfound Cave]. The cave, discovered by Viljem Putik at the end of the 19th century above the sinkholes of Unica river, which carries the waters from Postojnska jama, was just 250 meters long but a connection to an underground river was anticipated. After the breakthrough, a large cave opened up, 5 km in length.

Planina headed DZRJL in the aftermath, from 1967 to 1971 (also from 1984 to 1986), and under his leadership expeditions to very deep caves followed. The greatest impact had the 20-member expedition in 1969 to the cave Žankana jama (as it is called by the locals) near the village Rašpor, in Istria, Croatia. It is a sinkhole of a local creek that dries up in the summer, after some initial smaller shafts a large, 200 m deep inner abyss opens up. Between WWI and WWII Istria belonged to Italy, in the literature the cave was named Abisso Bertarelli, it was explored in 1924 and 1925. With a depth of 450 m, it was known, from 1924 to 1926, as the deepest cave in the world. After 1959 it was the deepest cave in Yugoslavia, which included Slovenia and Croatia, before Gotovž (also in Istria, −420 m) and Jazben (Slovenia, −365 m).

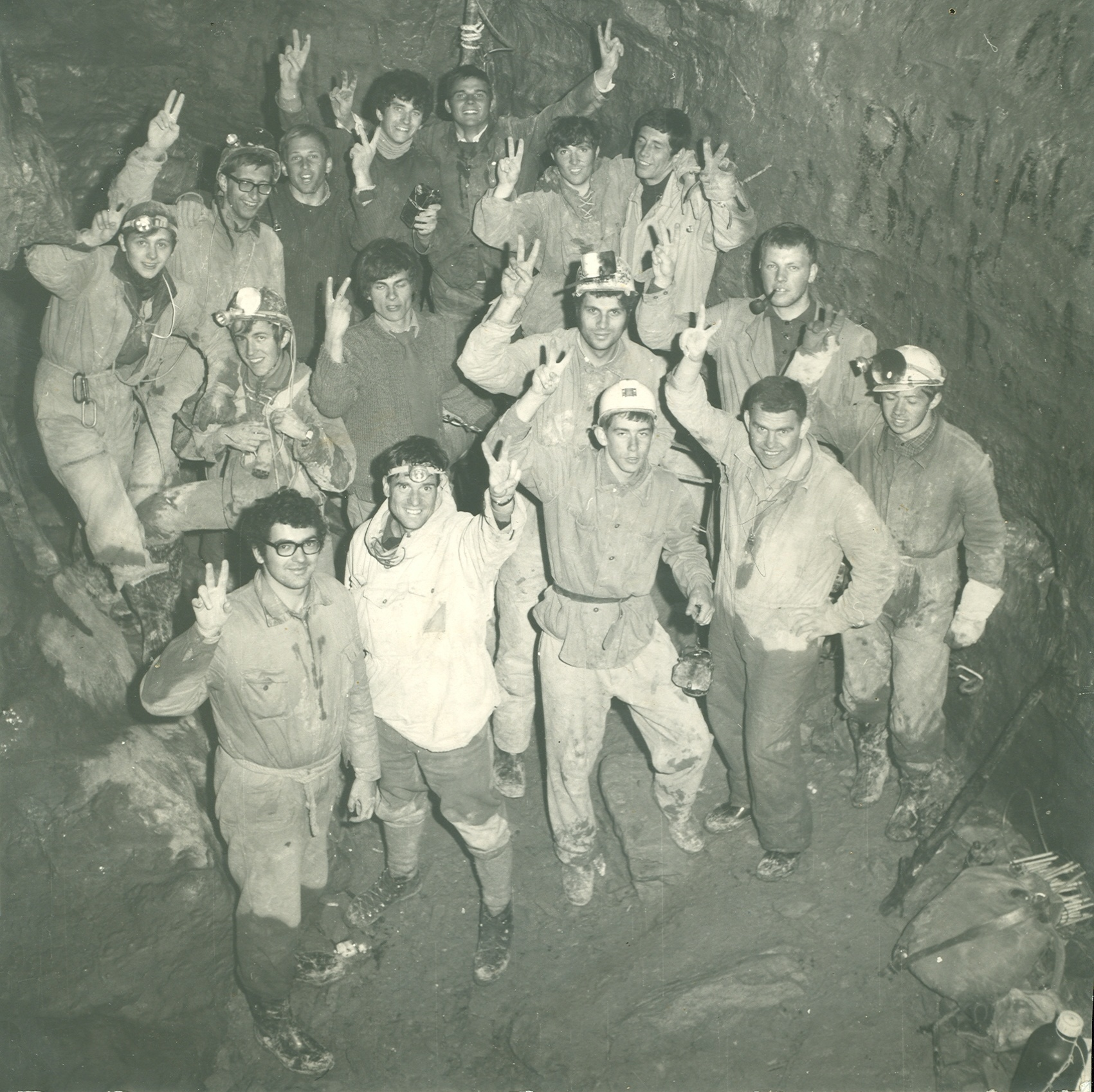
DZRJL team in Žankana jama, 1969

As it often happened that Italian pre-WWII surveys of caves in the littoral part of Slovenia showed greater depth than it actually was, one of the goals of the expedition was to make a precise new survey. The expedition reached the previously known bottom of the cave, the Italian siphon, at −346 m and continued through a long low muddy horizontal tunnel, till the Slovenian siphon, at −361 m. New depth would move the cave to third position on the Yugoslavian cave depth scale. DZRJL expeditions to Gotovž and Jazben, which followed, reduced the depth of Gotovž to 320 m and of Jazben to 334 m – Žankana jama remained on top of the list. These achievements positioned DZRJL at the top of Yugoslavian cave exploration.

The next big expedition, led by Planina, was to Brezno pri gamsovi glavici [Abyss at the chamois head] above Lake Bohinj in September 1972. The cave was discovered in 1969 by the cavers of Jamarski klub Železničar [Railway caving club], the other Ljubljana caving society. It was explored to a depth of 40 m in 1969, to −170 m in 1970, to −475 m in 1971, and to −615 m in August 1972, at an expedition where Jurij Andjelić-Yeti, a member of DZRJL, also participated. Depths were not surveyed, just estimated, so the task of the DZRJL team, which included Yeti, who knew the cave well, was to make the survey and to search for an eventual continuation. The cave depth was corrected to 444 m, which was still the second deepest cave in the country, and a continuation was also found. In the coming years following DZRJL expeditions deepened the cave to 817 m.

His main caving areas in Slovenia were Cerkniško jezero and caves of Planinsko polje, especially Rakov Škocjan, Križna jama and Najdena jama. Outside Slovenia, he was well acquainted with Velebit mountain ridge in Croatia and Durmitor massif in Montenegro – some parts of both botanically and speleologically rich areas he knew better than the locals.

== Rope testing ==
In the 1970s, when the single-rope technique replaced the use of wire ladders and both simplified and facilitated the mastering of deep shafts, Planina got interested in the issue of safety. The caver was no longer protected by a double wire and an additional rope in the hands of a colleague above the shaft – the rope contact to the walls, suitability of descending and ascending gear, rope's wear and tear, became crucial. He tested the rope breaking tensile strength in the laboratory, taking into account its age, impregnation, wear and tear, and knots with which the rope was fastened. Planina was also one of the founders of the Slovenian Cave Rescue Service, and a member of the editorial board of the main Slovenian caving journal, Naše jame [Our Caves], from 1977 till his death.

== Cave photography ==
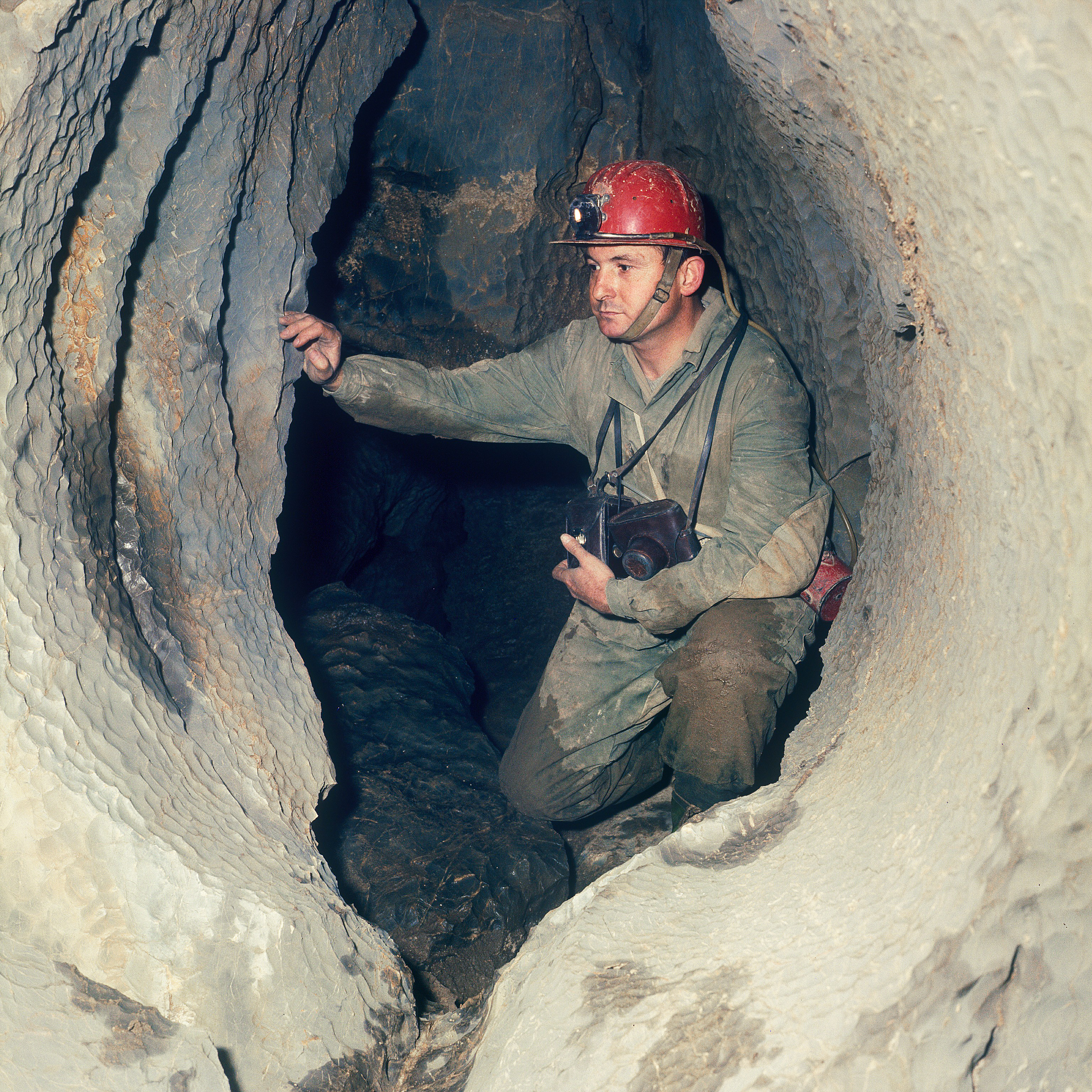
Planina in Križna jama, 1974

Planina was the third in the line of great Slovenian cave photographers, after Bogomil Brinšek (1884–1914) and Franci Bar (1901–1988), from whom he learned the arts and crafts of traditional cave photography. Already in the 1960s, he started to use 35 mm single-lens reflex cameras instead of large-format cameras, ubiquitous in cave photography at the time. Planina also abandoned air-polluting flash powder as a means of illumination and was the first to master the use of electronic flash. Proper lighting of large underground spaces, especially with low-reflection surfaces, such as mud, requires a sequence of multiple flashes at full power, usually from several positions. To make the application of electronic units feasible Planina added a large external battery pack which shortened the flash refresh rate to just a few seconds and made possible several hundred flashes. His photos documented most of DZRJL expeditions in the 1960s and 1970s, while his most accomplished works were made in Križna jama water cave. Planina's works appeared regularly in the natural science press, they were used for cave promotion, and he also published articles about caves and cave photography techniques.

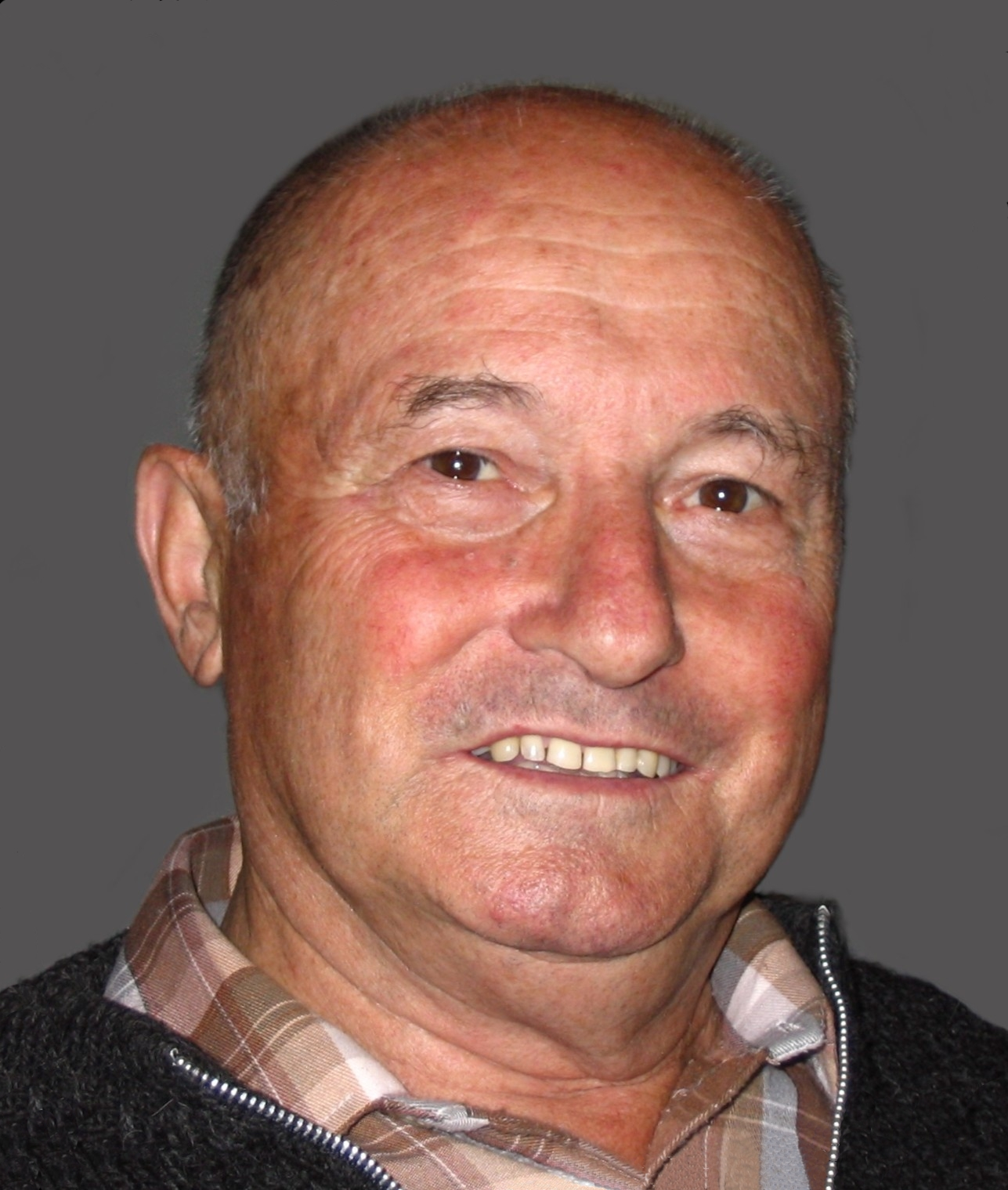
Planina in 2000

== Accident in the mountains ==
During a field trip to Mt. Jalovec in 1994, a larger rock rolled down the snowy couloir and smashed Planina's leg below the knee. The convalescence, which terminated his professional career, lasted several years, he could walk again but he never fully recovered. He died just before New Year's Eve 2015 of complications after a prolonged illness.

== Legacy ==
Planina's work is utilised in his local speleological institution, the Ljubljana Cave Exploration Society, and Slovenian caving in general, important is his contribution to the improvements and safety of caving equipment. He promoted alternative, cleaner cave photography techniques, in order to preserve the cave environment. Planina was "a bridge between generations" and a "great mentor", remembered by fellows for his zest for caving.

== Photo gallery ==
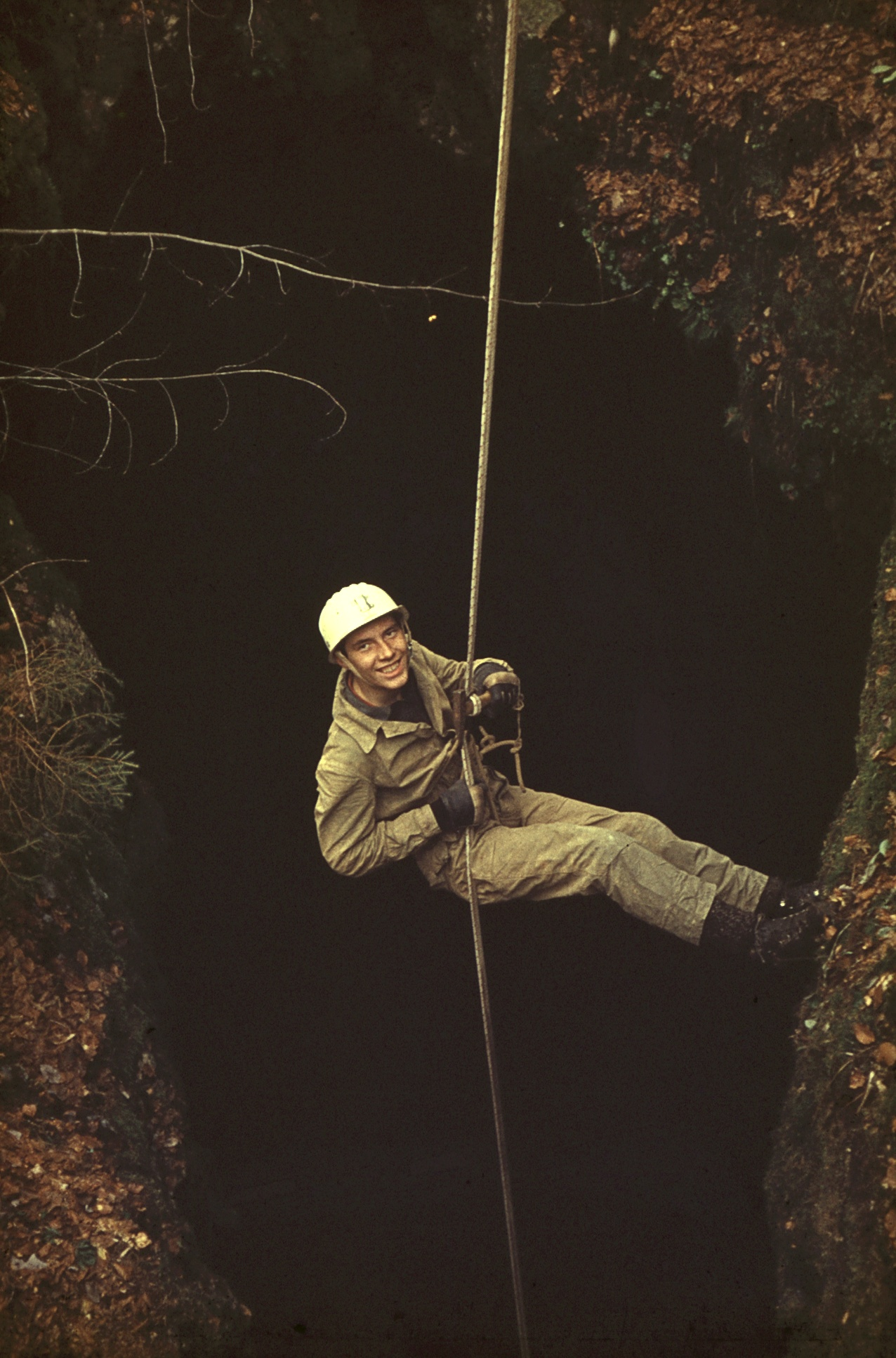
Hammer brake descent, 1961

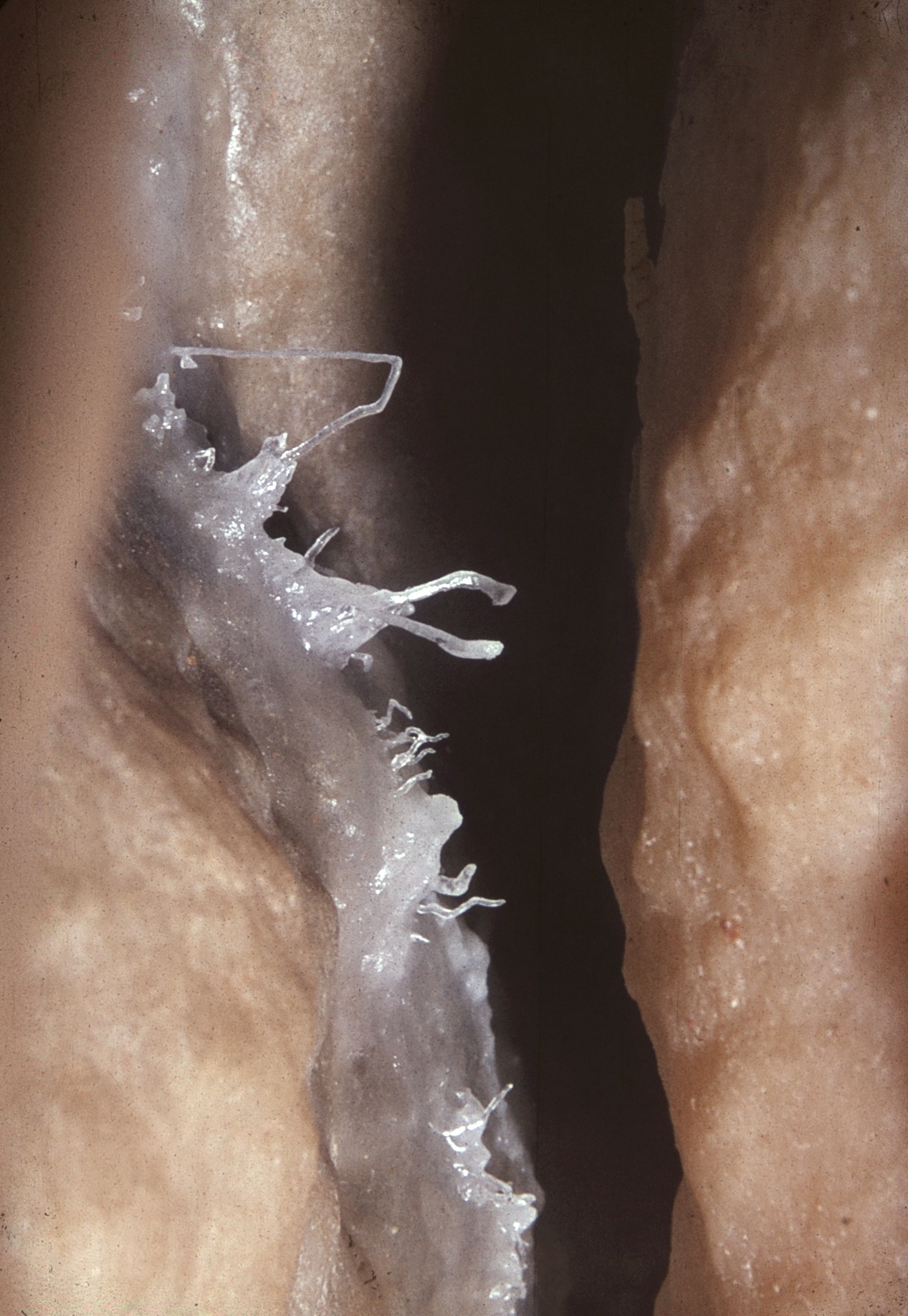
Helictites on a stalactite, 1966

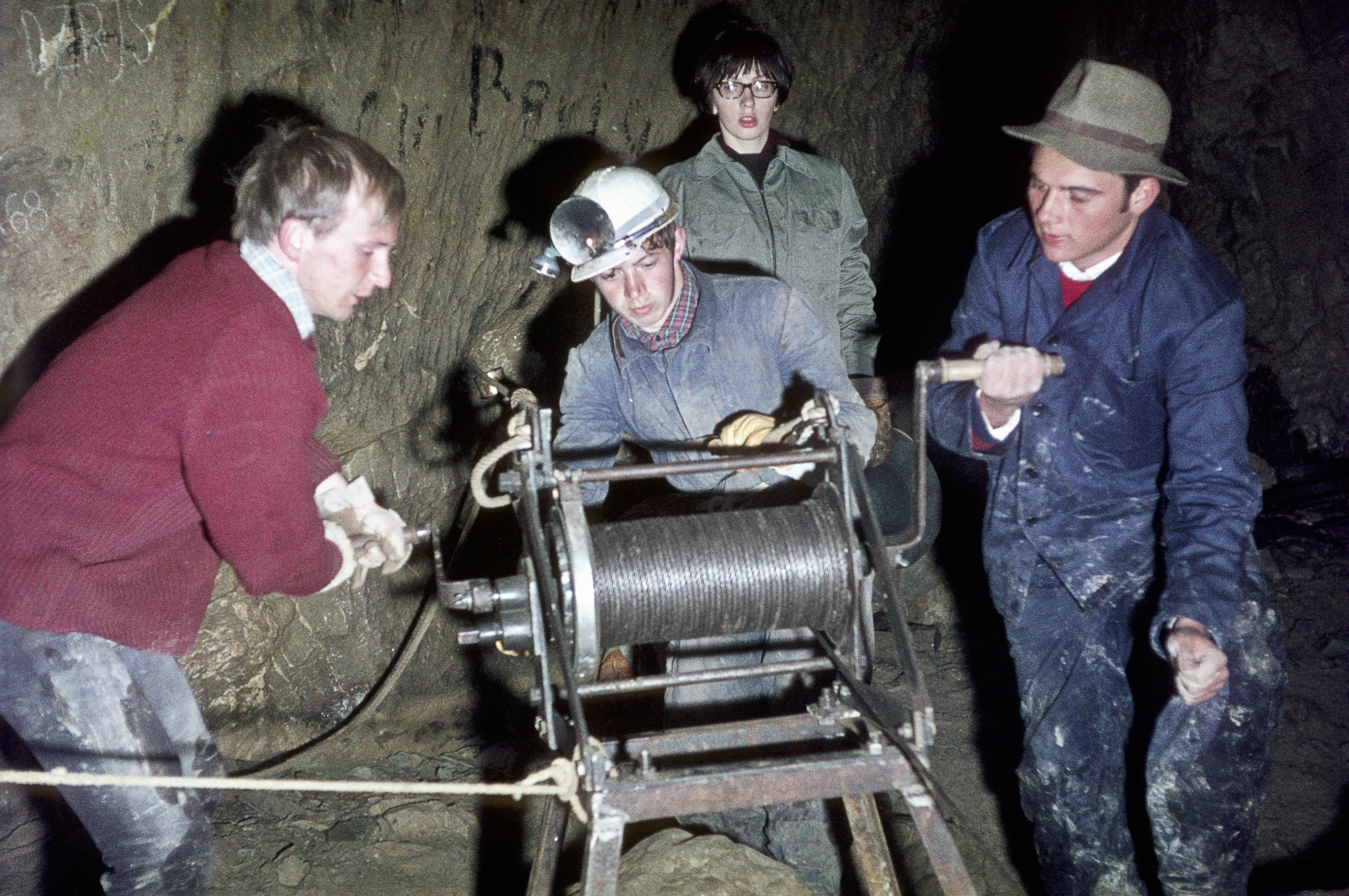
Operating the hand winch, 1969

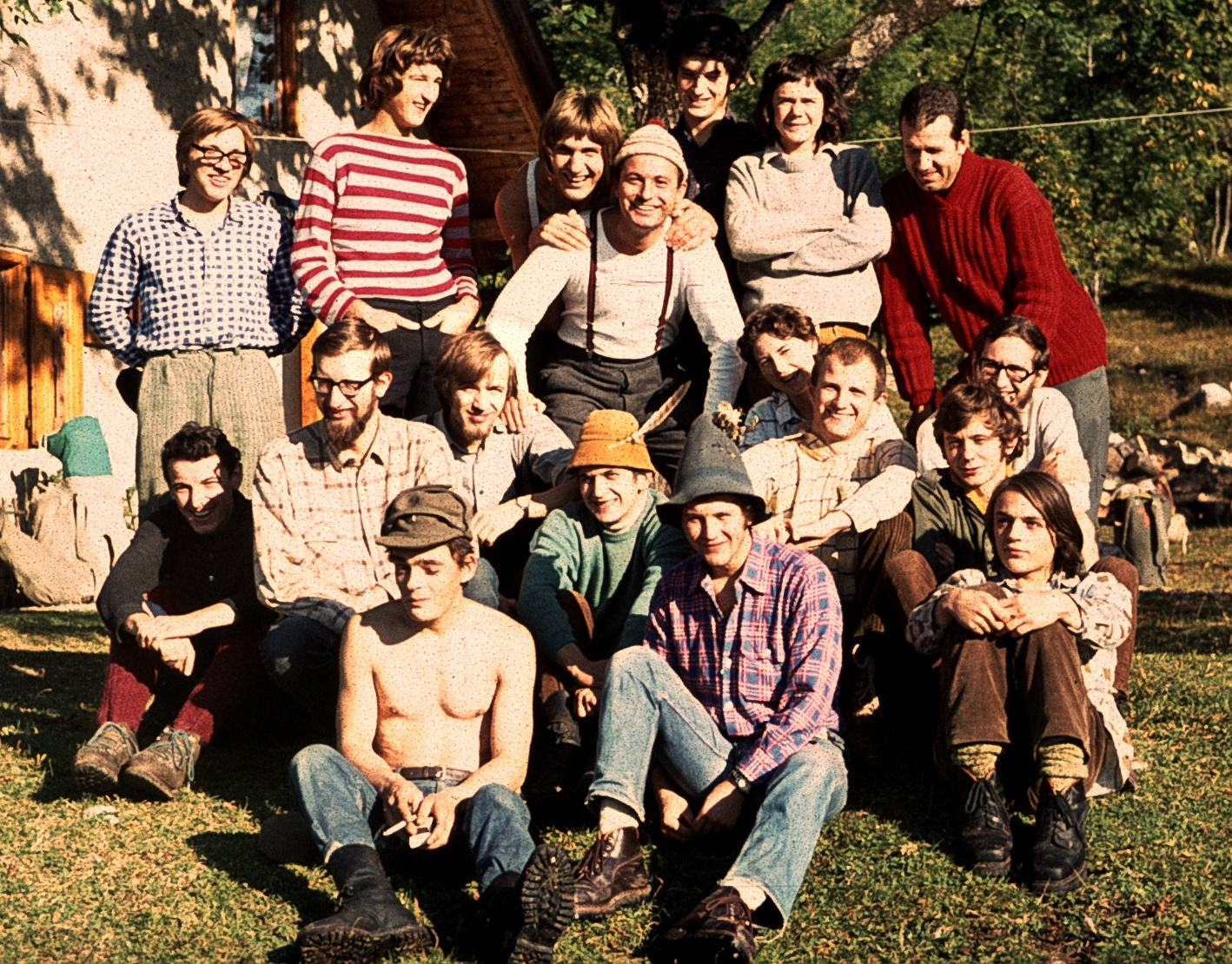
DZRJL expedition at Vogar, 1972

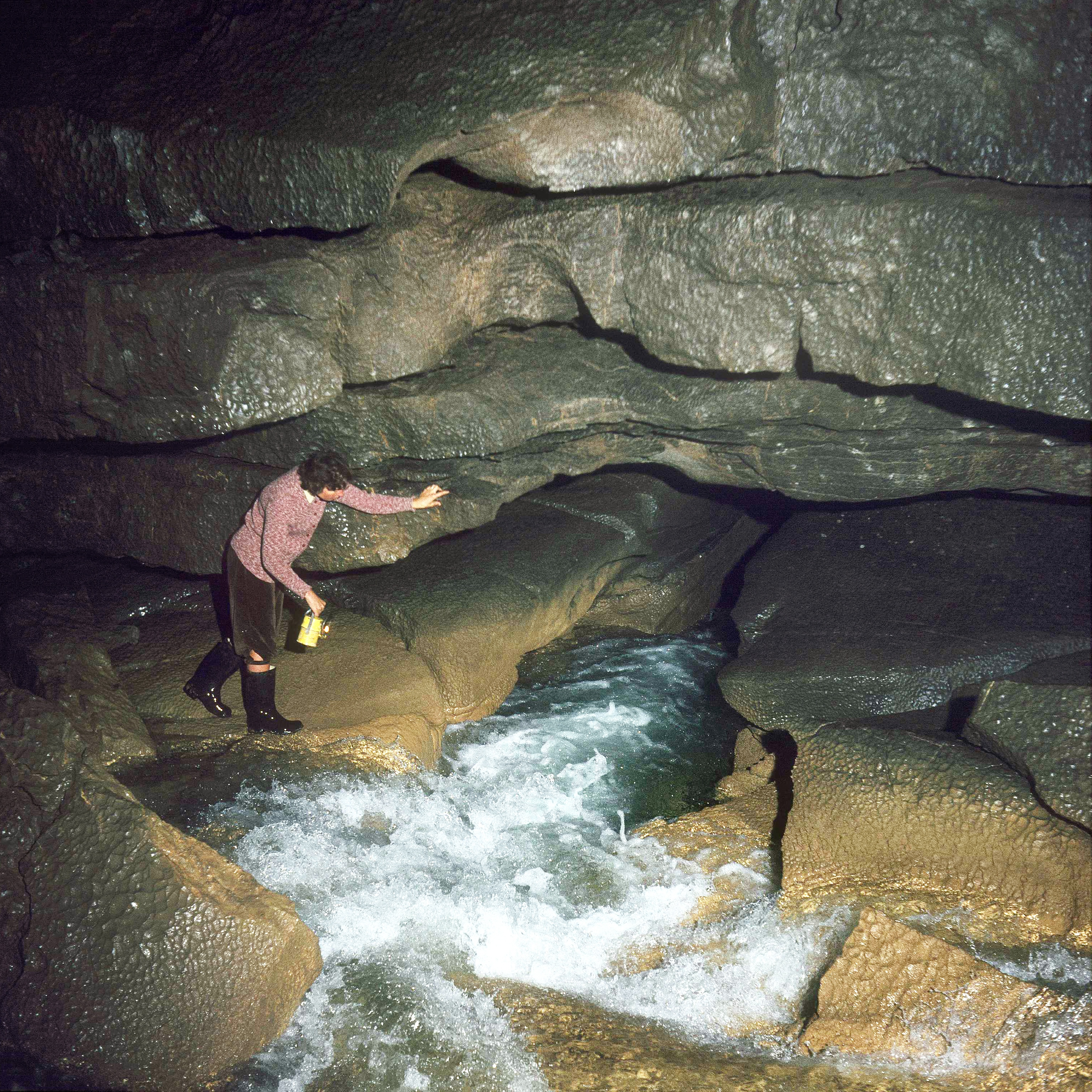
Cave stream sinkhole, 1973

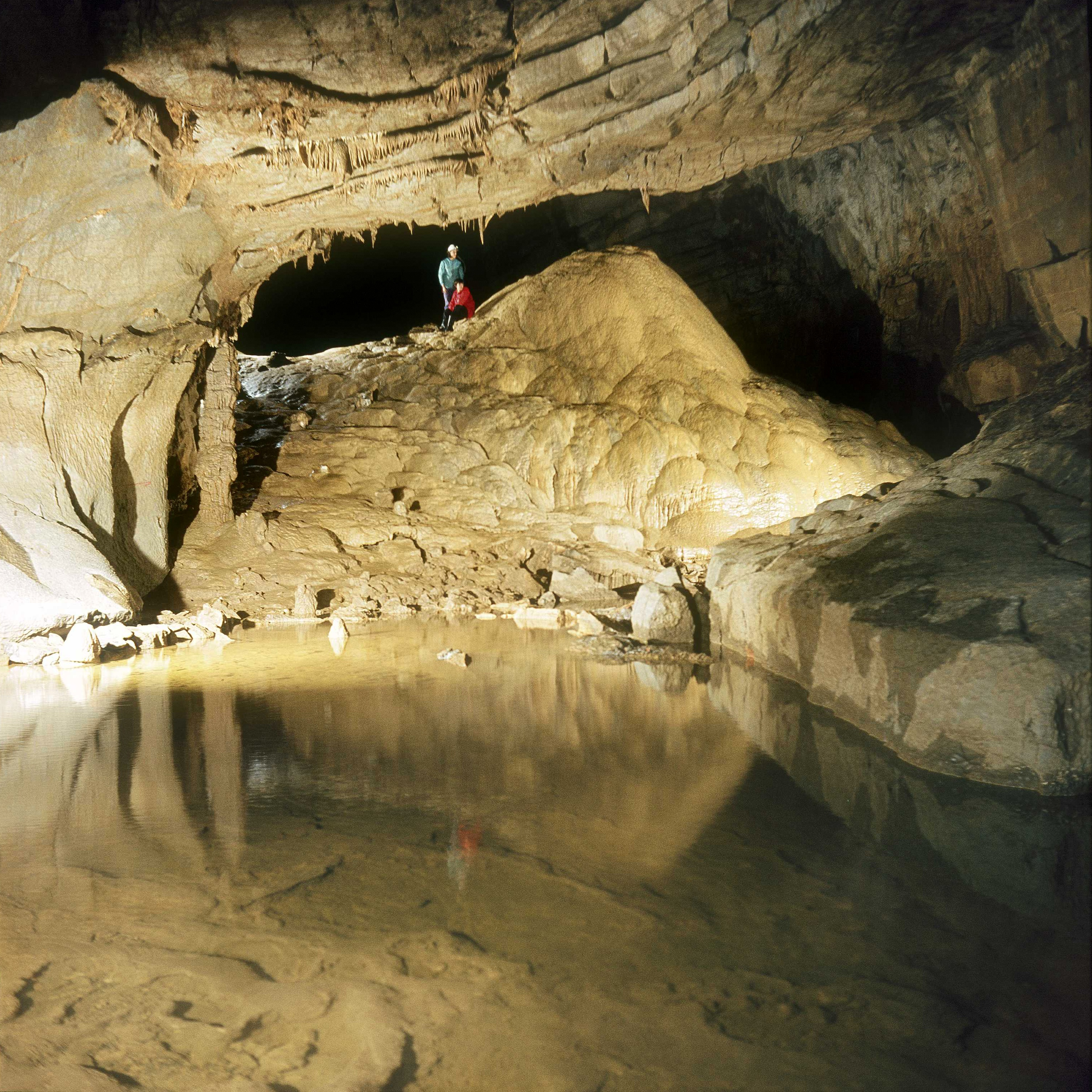
Chimborazo above the lake, 1973

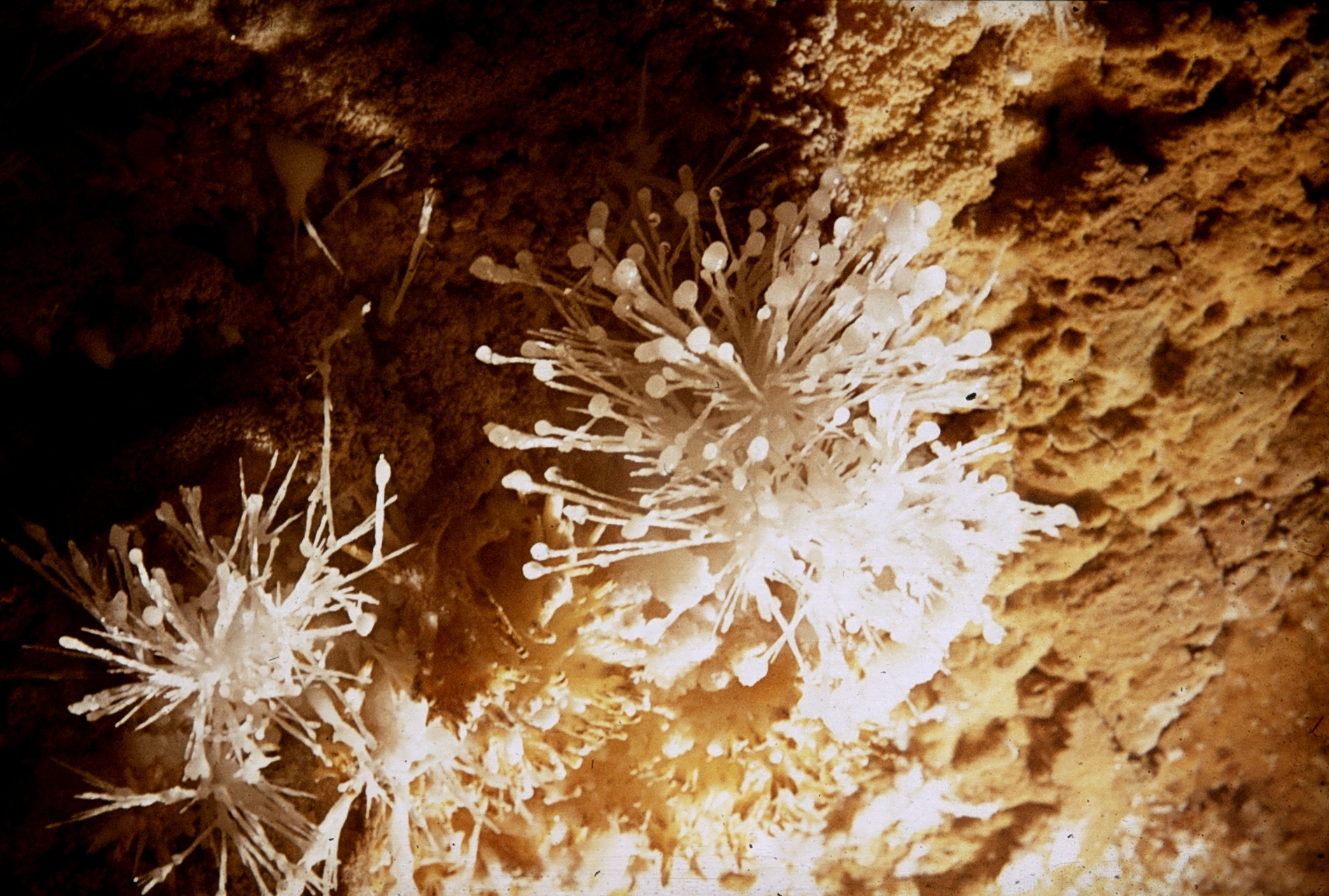
Aragonite crystals, 1973

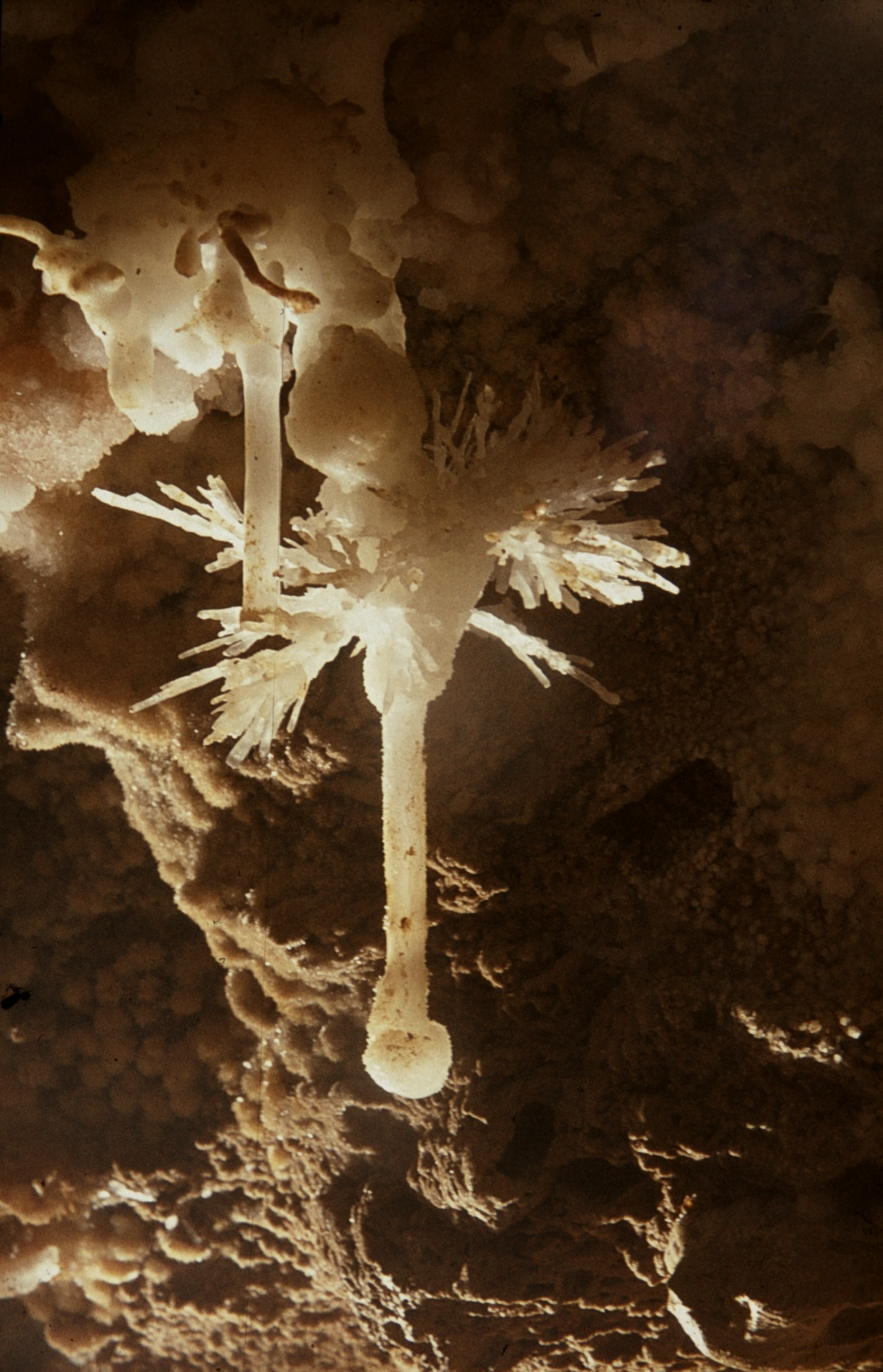
Calcite and aragonite forms, 1973

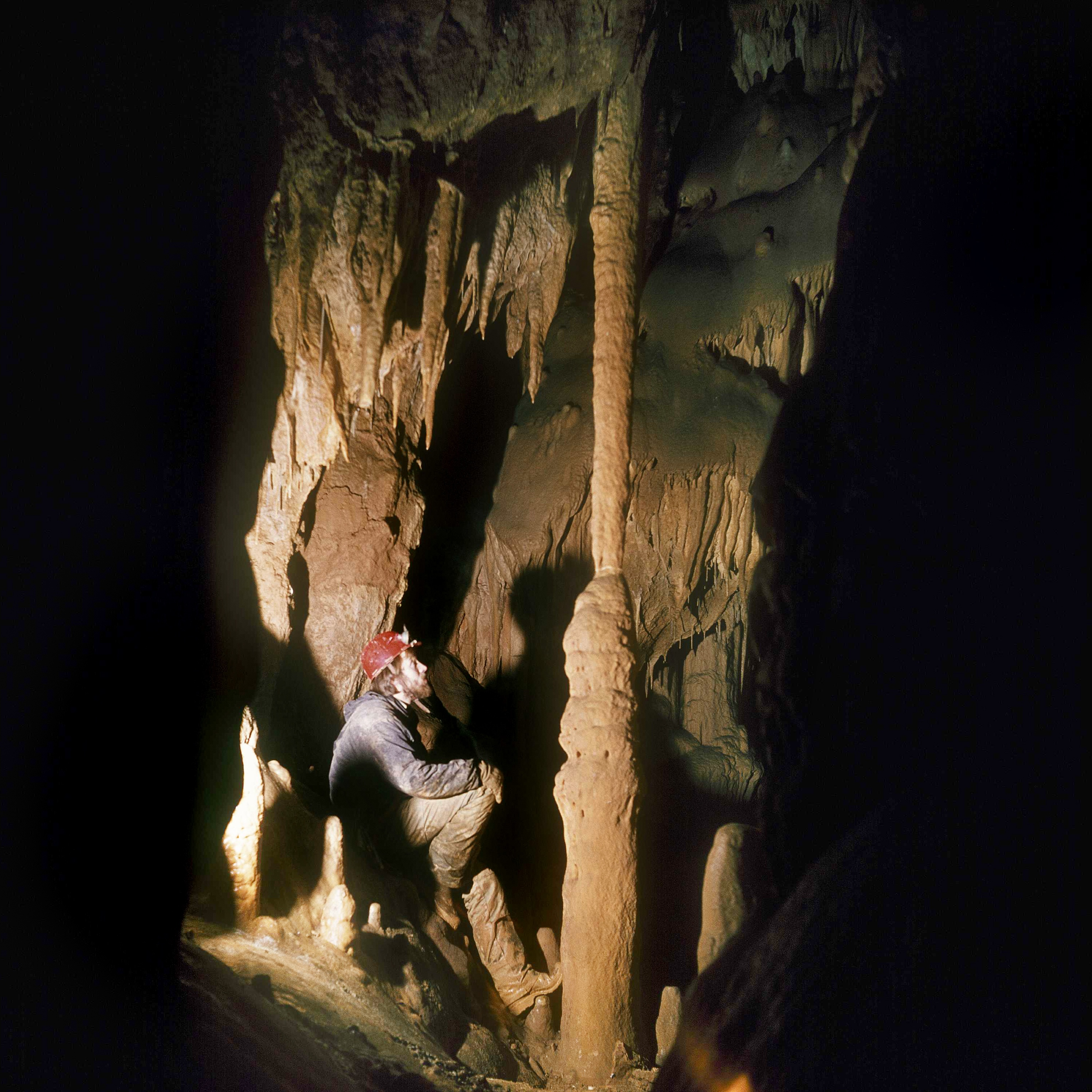
Calcite pillar, 1975

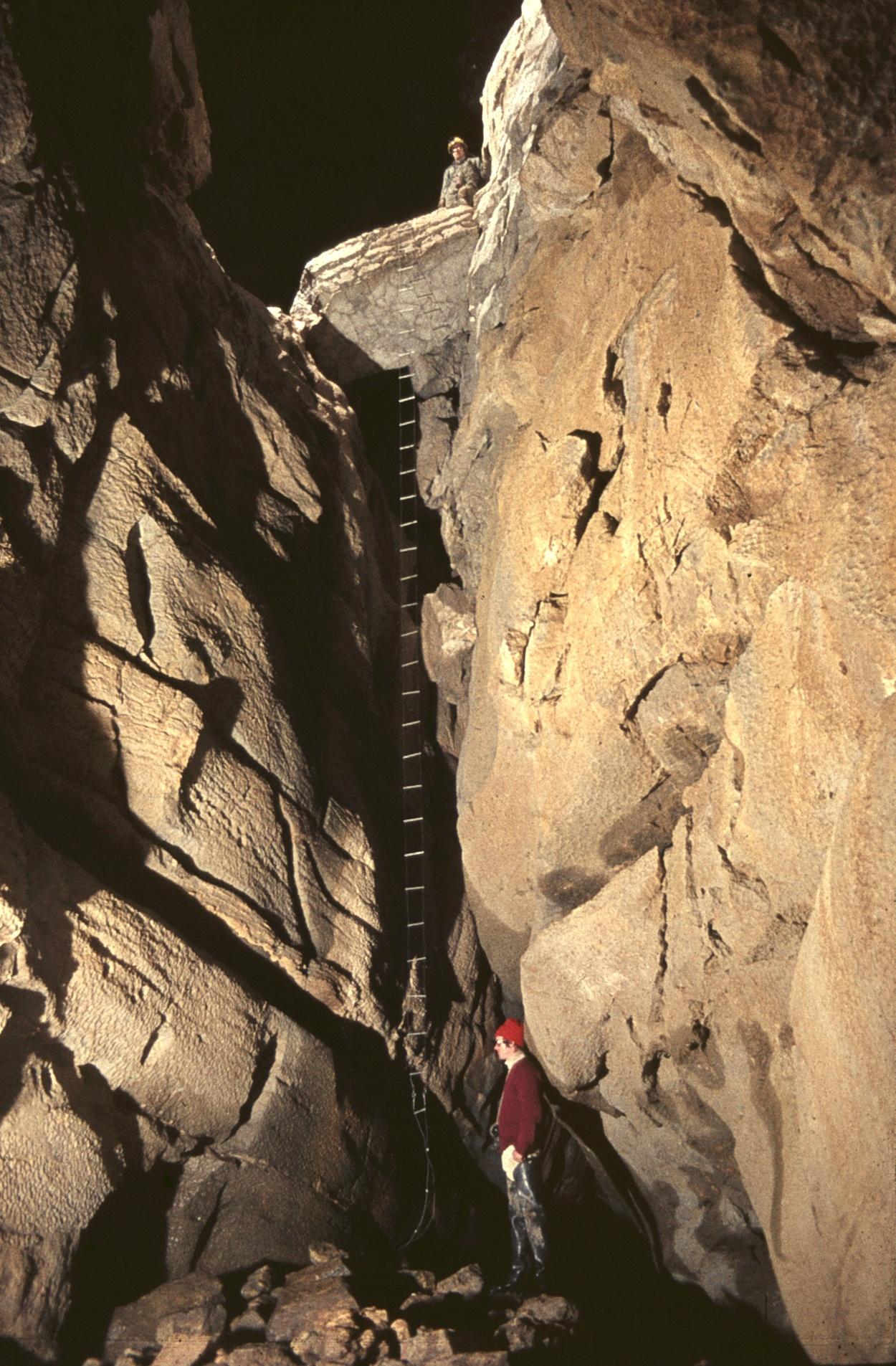
The descent down a wall, 1975

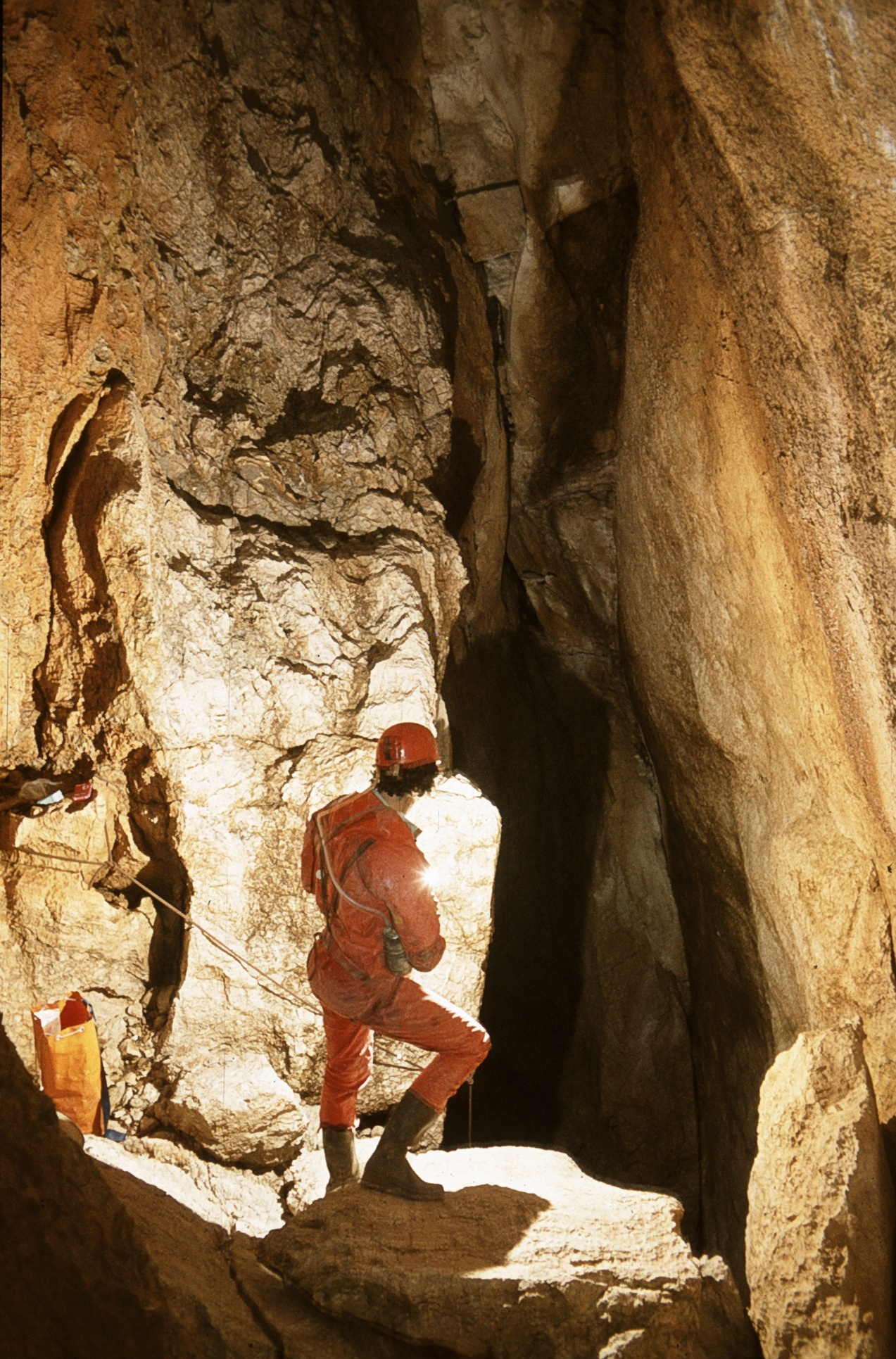
High mountain cave shaft, 1982

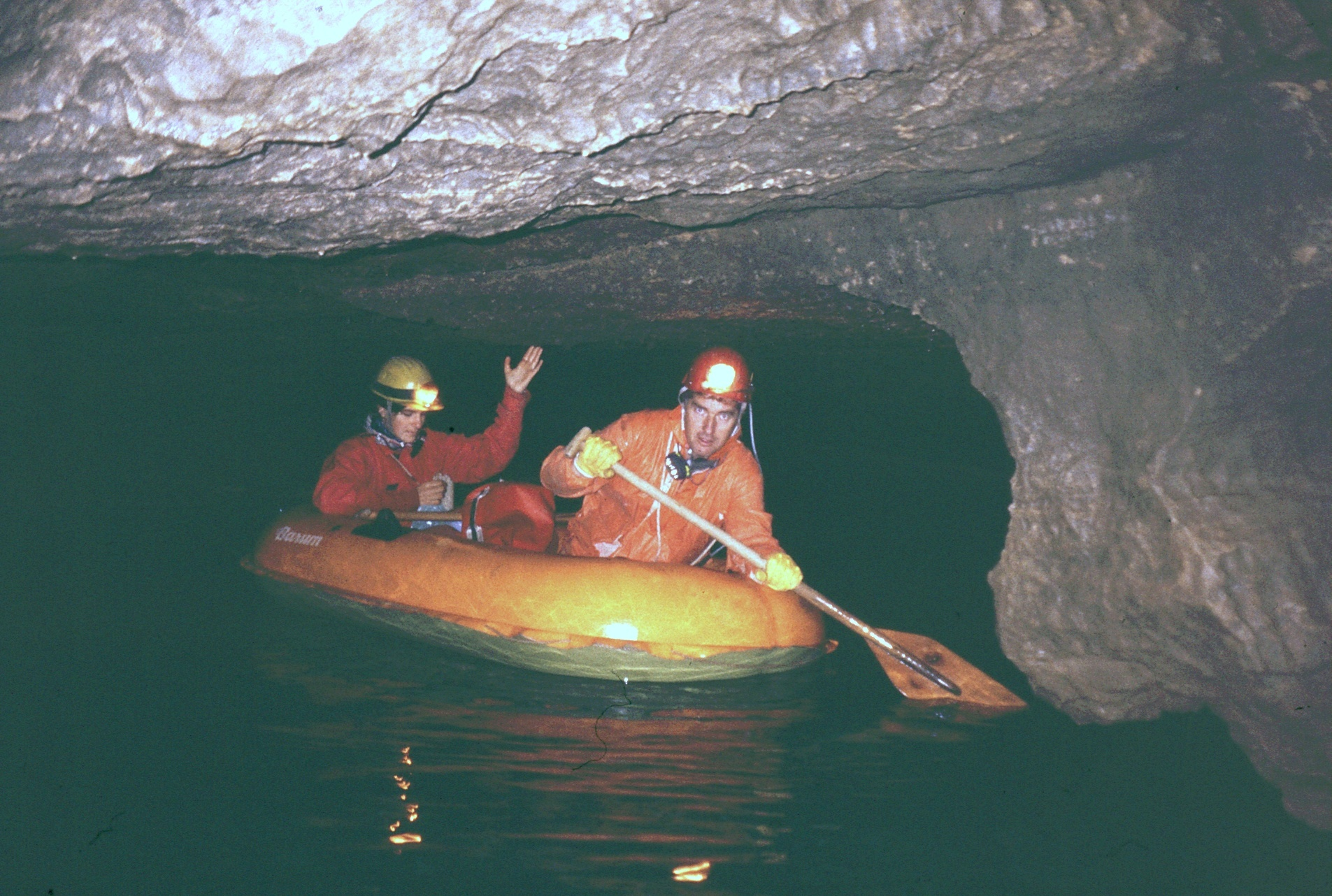
Boat in a cave passage, 1996
