= Zelše =

Village in Inner Carniola, Slovenia

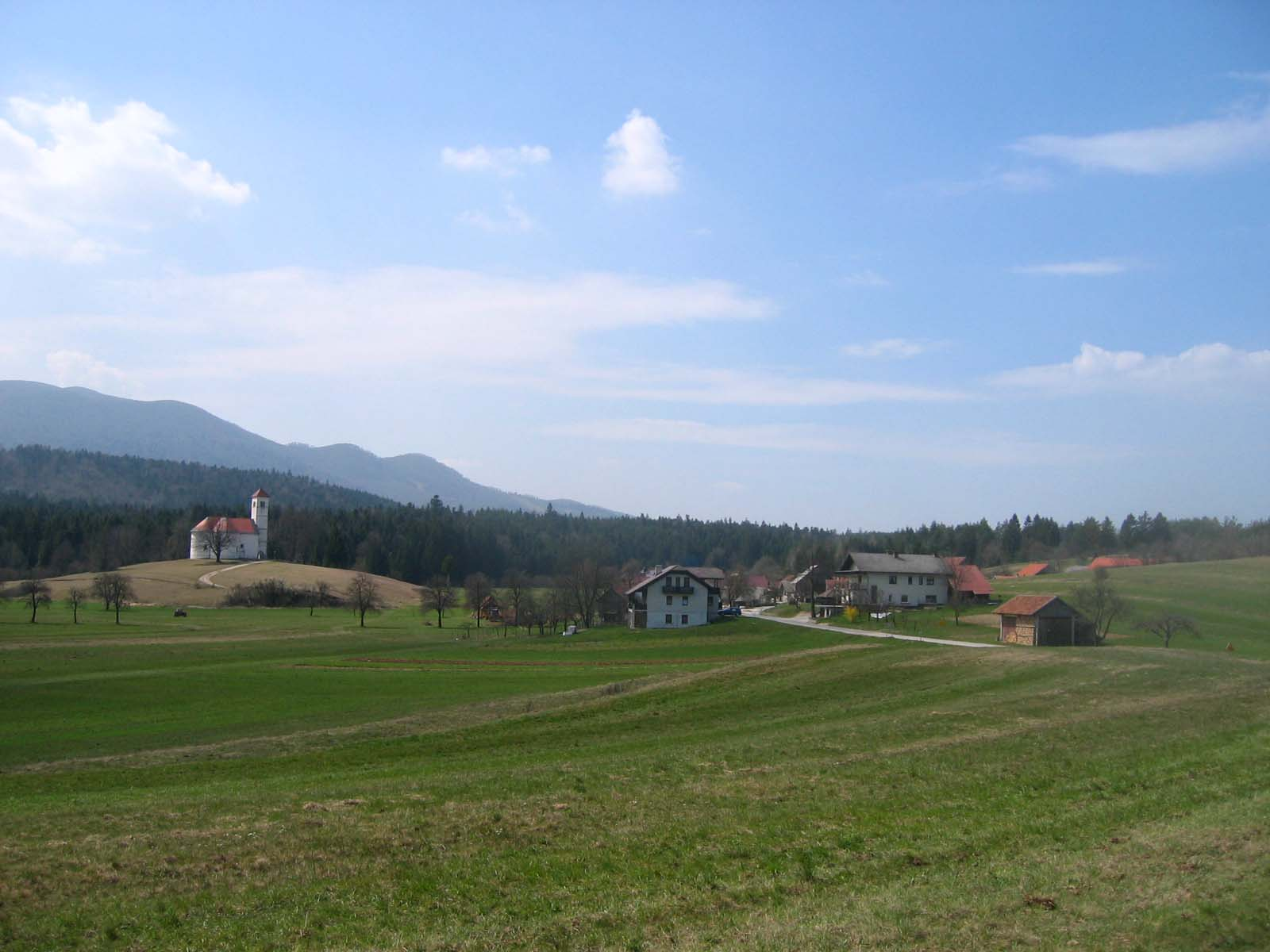

- Location in Slovenia
- Coordinates: 45°47′37.92″N 14°19′39.48″E
- Country: Slovenia
- Traditional region: Inner Carniola
- Statistical region: Littoral–Inner Carniola
- Municipality: Cerknica

Area
  - Total: 4.19 km^{2} (1.62 sq mi)
- Elevation: 558.9 m (1,834 ft)

Population (2020)
  - Total: 97
  - Density: 23/km^{2} (60/sq mi)

Zelše (pronounced [ˈzeːu̯ʃɛ]; in older sources also Želše, German: Selsach) is a village along the road linking Cerknica and Postojna, at the northwestern part of the karst Cerknica Polje in the Inner Carniola region of Slovenia. Zelše Caves (Zelške jame)—the source of Rak Creek, a sinking stream—lies west of the village. Big Karlovica Cave (Slovene: Velika Karlovica), receiving the waters of Stržen Creek, lies southwest of the village. Industrial facilities are located east of the village.

== Description ==
Located on the western edge of the intermittently flooded Cerknica Karst Field, Zelše occupies a low, doline-pitted limestone terrace 560 m above sea level, halfway along the regional road from Cerknica to Postojna. Although the cadastral area covers only 4.2 km^{2}, nearly a third is meadow and permanent pasture, whereas larch and spruce forests cloak the steeper karst rises to the south. The 2020 census logged 97 permanent residents—mostly commuters to Cerknica—with a handful of family farms that still practise the traditional late-summer mowing timed to the drainage of the karst field.

Beneath the turf runs a dense conduit network that feeds two of Slovenia's better-known karst springs. Zelše Caves (Slovene: Zelške jame) begin in the woods 500 m west of the last house; tracer and cave surveys show 5.5 km of explored passages that capture allogenic runoff from the Bloke Plateau and deliver it as the nascent Rak River only minutes later in Rak Škocjan. Southwest of the village, Big Karlovica Cave takes the waters of Stržen Creek when Lake Cerknica overflows, funnelling the karst field flood into the same Rak system. Numerical modelling of this twin-sink arrangement identifies Zelše as the hydrological "switchboard" that controls how quickly Lake Cerknica can empty after high water and how sharply Rak Škocjan will flood during extreme events. Because both caves lie within the planned extension of Inner Carniola Regional Park, their catchments are now a focus of strict groundwater-quality monitoring and seasonal visitor limits.

== Church ==
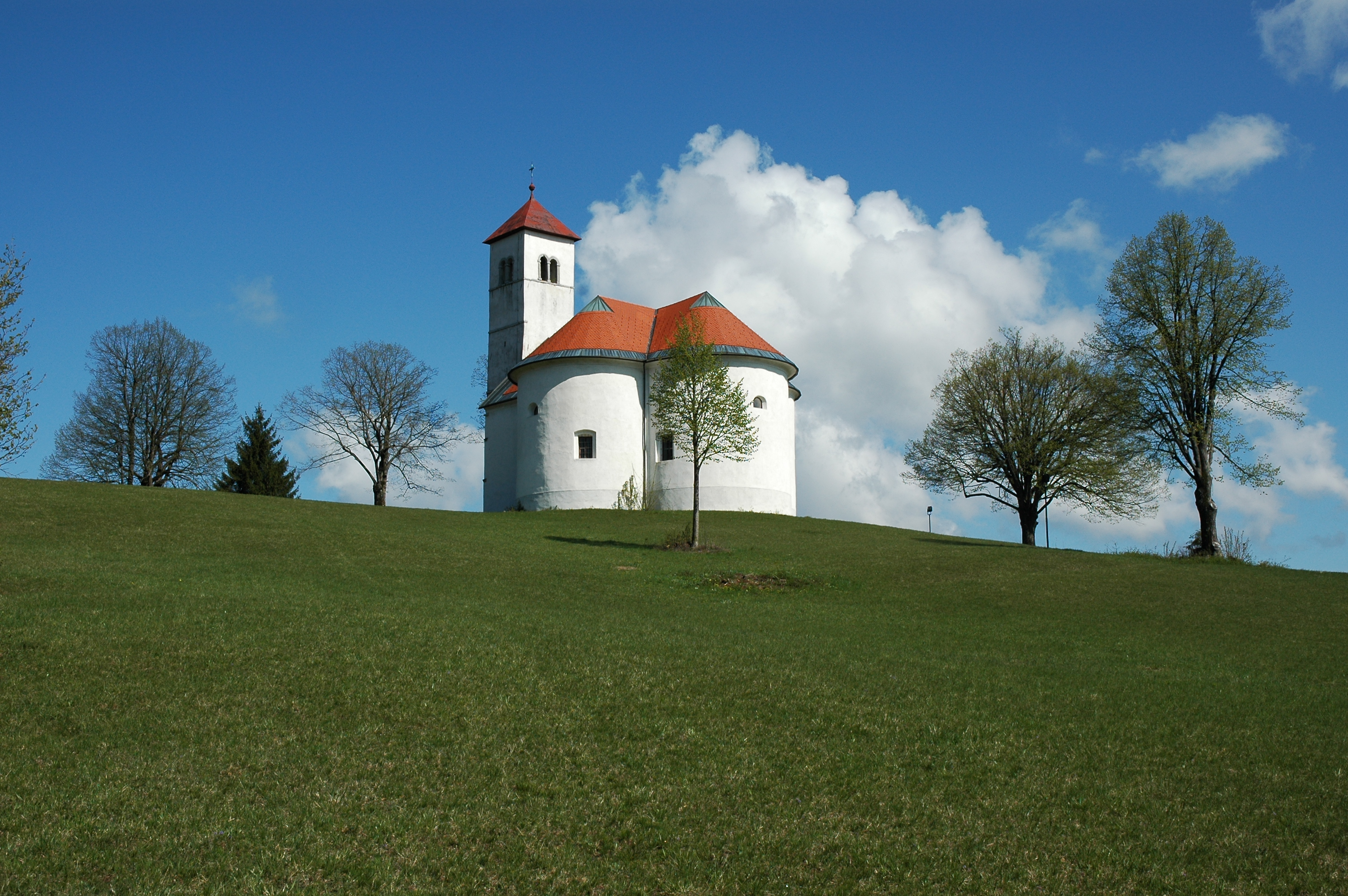
Saint Wolfgang's Church

South of the main crossroads, the village landmark—Saint Wolfgang's Church (Slovene sveti Volbenk)—stands on a low knoll. The church is dedicated to Saint Wolfgang (Slovene: sveti Volbenk) and belongs to the Parish of Cerknica. This Renaissance church was built around 1680 with a triple rounded apse, unique in the region. The Baroque-style belfry was added in 1732. The church has excellent acoustics and is sometimes used as a venue for various concerts.
