= Rak (stream) =

Stream in Inner Carniola, Slovenia

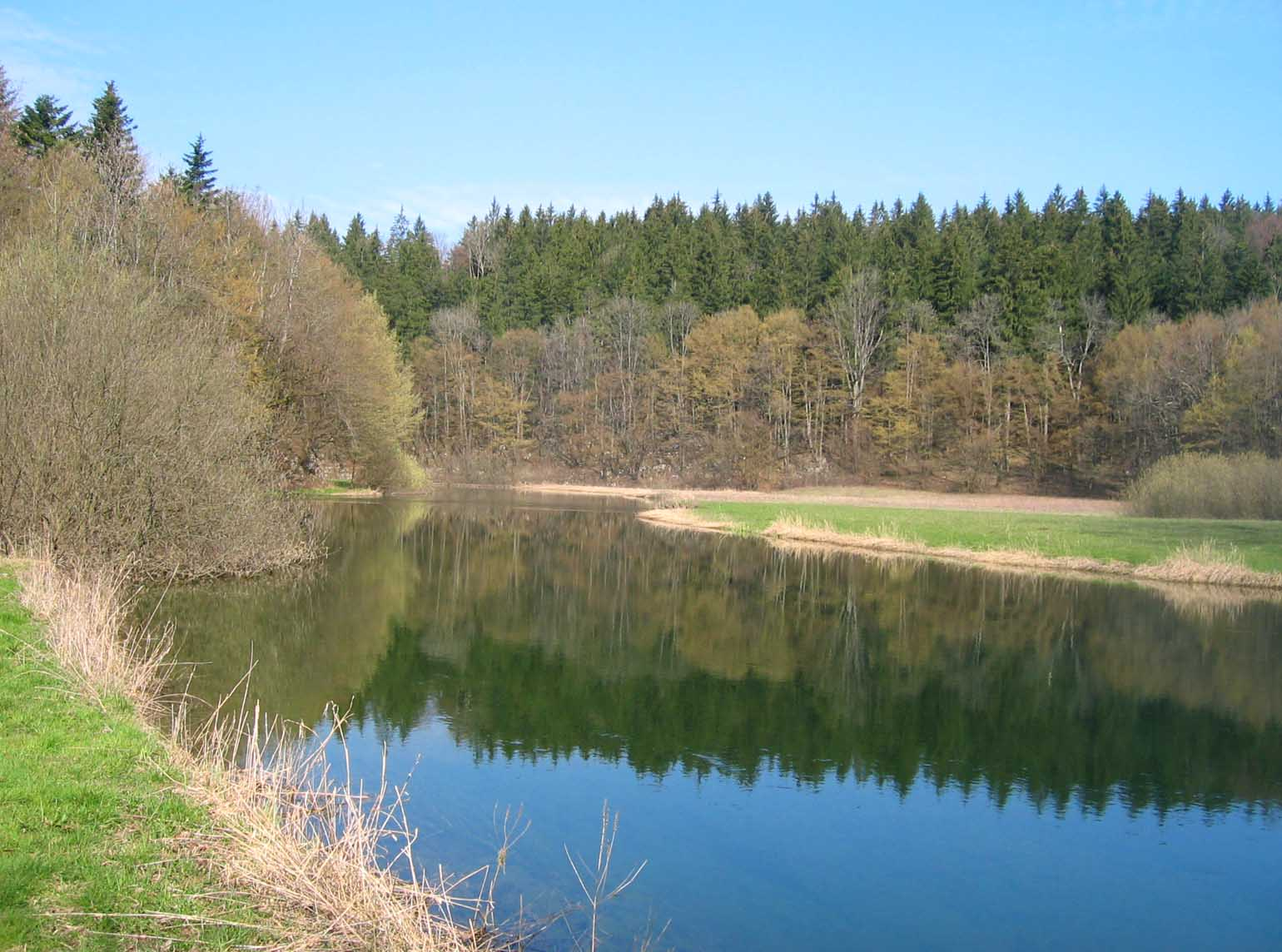
- The Rak in Rak Škocjan

Location
- Country: Slovenia

Physical characteristics
- Source
  - location: Rak Škocjan
  - coordinates: 45°47′27.52″N 14°17′41.19″E
- Mouth
  - location: disappears in Weaver Cave in Rak Škocjan

Basin features
- Progression: Unica→ Ljubljanica→ Sava→ Danube→ Black Sea

The Rak is a stream in Inner Carniola, a traditional region of southeastern Slovenia. It sources in Zelše Caves (Zelške jame) west of the village of Zelše, flows across the Rak Škocjan karst valley for 2 kilometres (1.2 mi) and enters Weaver's Cave (Slovene: Tkalca jama), where it continues for 3 kilometres (1.9 mi) and merges in Planina Cave (Planinska jama), about 300 metres (980 ft) from its entrance, with the Pivka River to form the Unica. The confluence of the Rak and the Pivka is one of the largest subterranean confluences in Europe.

== Description ==
Rising from the karst springs of the Zelše Caves, the Rak at once enters the collapsed valley of Rak Škocjan, a UNESCO-recognised karst window noted for its two natural limestone bridges. After meandering for barely 2 km, the stream plunges underground at Weaver Cave, then runs a further 3 km through flooded galleries to merge with the sinking Pivka River inside Planina Cave. That subterranean confluence—one of Europe's largest—creates the Unica River and connects the Rak to the 800 km^{2} Ljubljanica aquifer, hydraulically linking Lake Cerknica and the Planina Karst Field.

Tracer dye tests show that high-water pulses flow through the Rak–Planina conduit at 90 to 640 cubic metres per hour ( m h^{−1}), whereas summer recession flows slow to under 25 m h^{−1} and may stall in the pool-and-riffle reaches of Weaver Cave. These swings explain why heavy rain on the plateau can raise water in Rak Škocjan by more than ten metres—submerging the natural bridges—while prolonged drought can dry the surface channel entirely. Continuous logging during the 2008–2011 campaign recorded distinct chemical and thermal signatures: winter floods carry cool, allogenic runoff from Lake Cerknica's flysch rim, whereas low-stage flows are fed almost solely by autogenic recharge from the surrounding limestone massif.

Despite its brevity, the Rak supports a varied cold-water fauna. Annual surveys list brown trout, pike, European chub, tench, and stone loach, with occasional grayling and perch spread across just 4.8 ha of open water. The valley is protected as a landscape park: angling is suspended during heatwaves, and floods—which scour fine sediments from the doline floor—are left unimpeded to maintain spawning gravels and flush nutrients into the subterranean reaches inhabited by rare cave invertebrates. Together these geomorphic, hydrological and ecological traits make the short-lived Rak an ideal natural laboratory for studying how temperate karst rivers respond to both Mediterranean cloudbursts and Alpine droughts.
