= Planina Cave =

Cave in Slovenia

Coordinates: 45°49′14.9″N 14°14′47.36″E

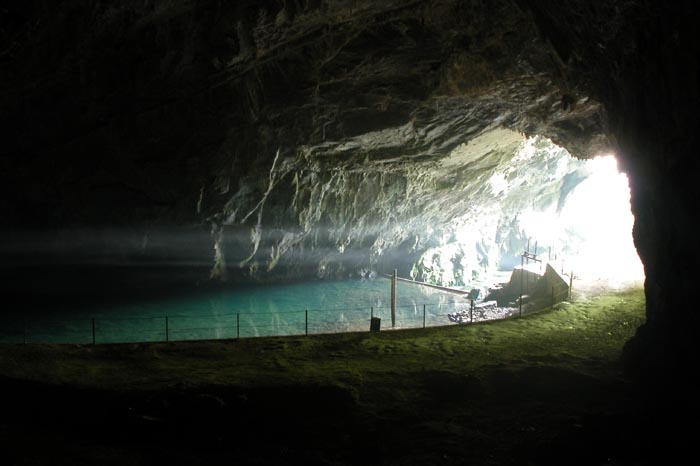
The entrance to Planina Cave

Planina Cave (Slovene: Planinska jama), formerly also Little Castle Cave (Malograjska jama) after Little Castle in the vicinity of its entrance, is one of the longest Slovenian active caves. It is a huge tunnel and the subterranean bed of the Unica River. It is located in Inner Carniola. Five hundred meters from the entrance into the cave is a confluence of two underground rivers: the Pivka River, flowing from the Postojna Polje through Postojna Cave, and the Rak River, flowing to Planina Cave through Weaver Cave from Rak Škocjan. This is one of the largest confluences of subterranean rivers in Europe.

Entrance into the cave is at the southwestern part of Planina Polje in the gable end valley below 65 high rocks. The length of the cave is 6,656 m (21,837 ft). It has been shown by water tracing that there is a connection between the systems of Planina Cave and Postojna Cave, and the administration of Postojna Cave estimates the connection will also be explored by cavers. The length of the joint system would be over 31 kilometres (19 mi).

== Geographical data ==
- latitude: 45°49'12" N (WGS 84)
- longitude: 14°14'45" E
- elevation: 453 m (1,486 ft)
- length of the cave: 6,656 m (21,837 ft)
- subterranean depth: −65 m (−213 ft)

== Gallery ==
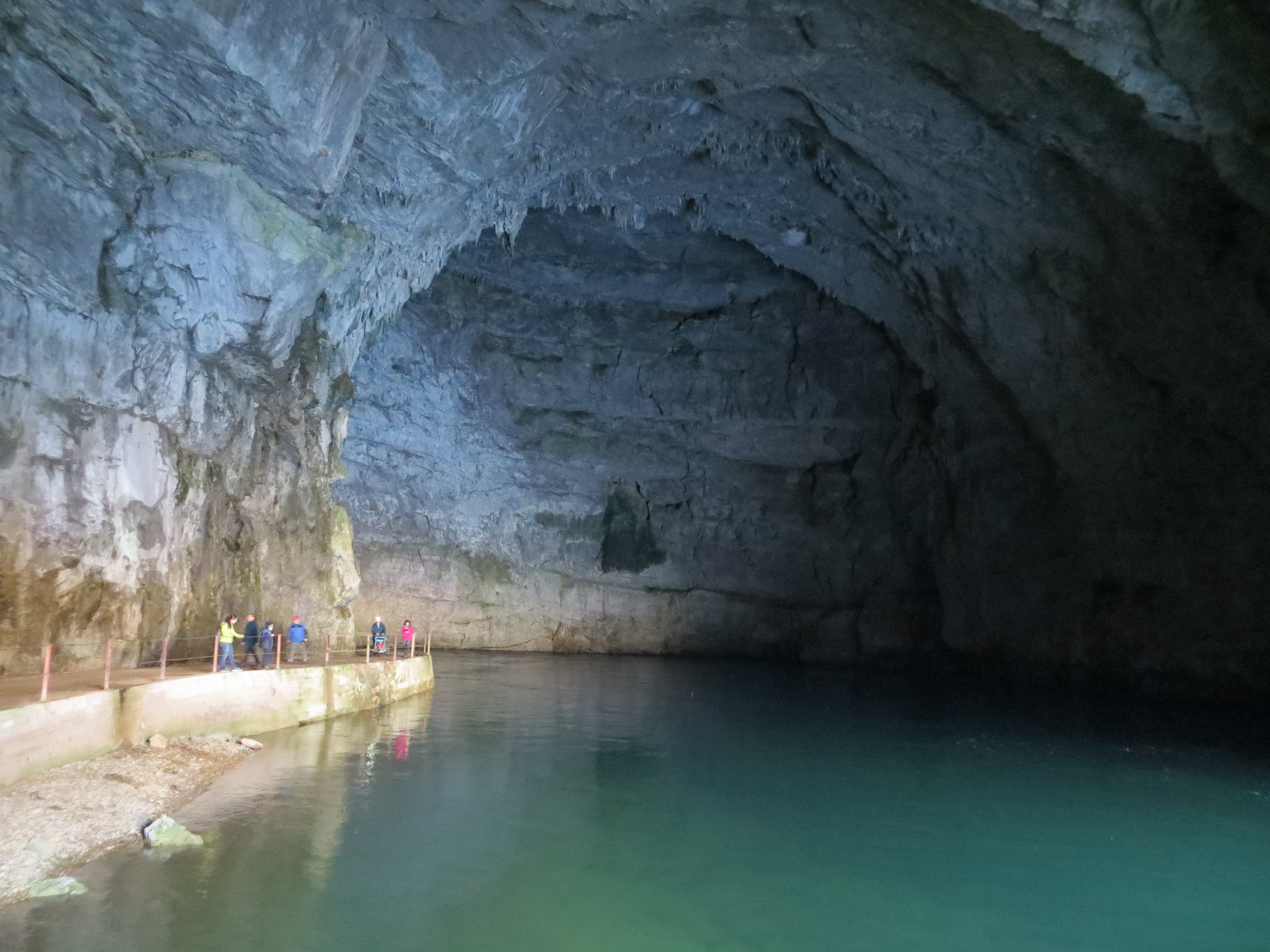
Inside the mouth of Planina Cave

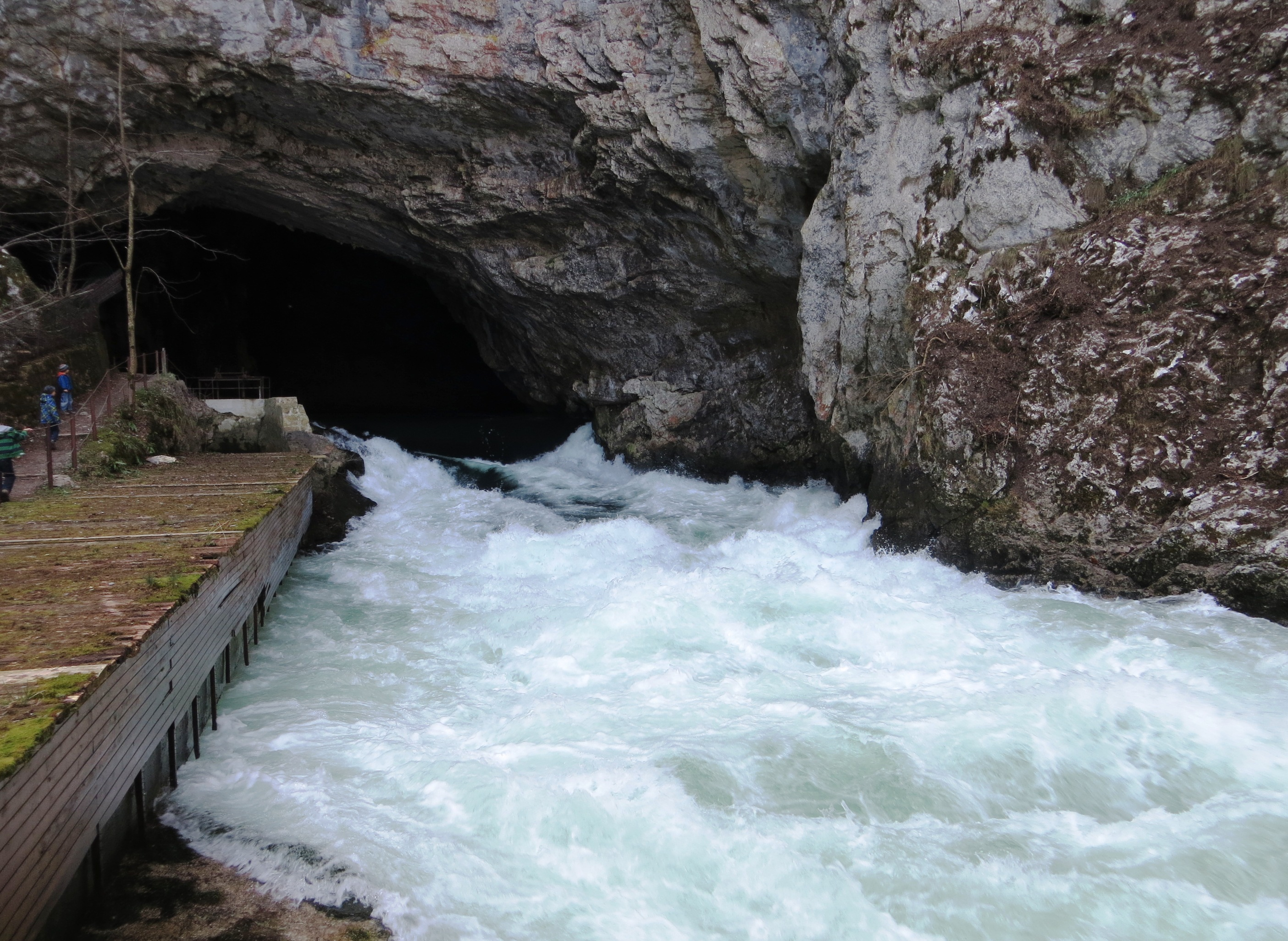
The Unica River emerging from the cave

A video of the Unica emerging from the cave

== See also ==
- List of deepest Dinaric caves
- List of longest Dinaric caves
