= Weaver Cave =

Cave in Slovenia

Coordinates: 45°47′36.35″N 14°17′11.66″E

The Rak going underground in Weaver Cave. The first part of the video was recorded from the upper entrance of the cave, and the second part near the ponor.

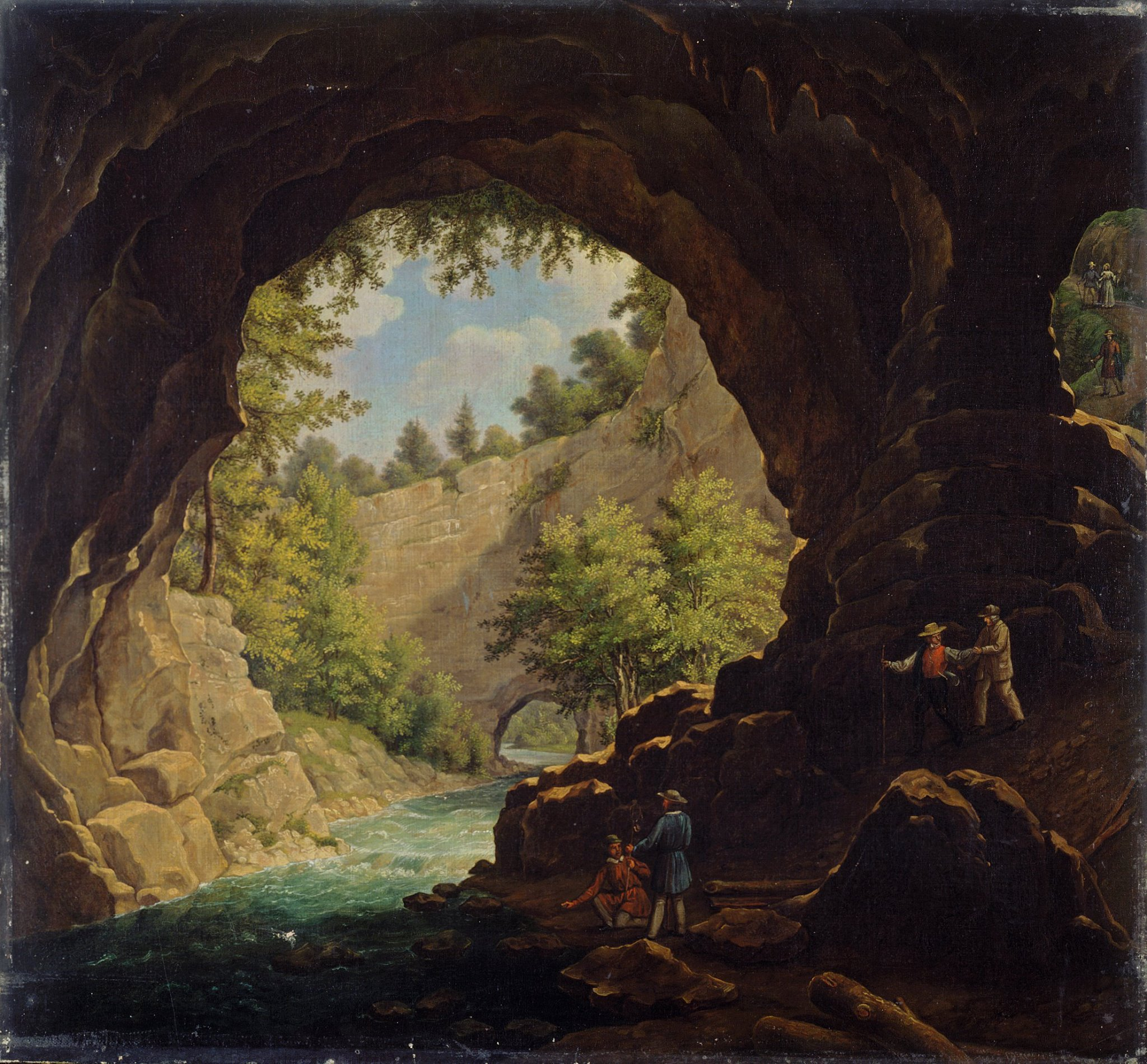
Depiction of Rak Škocjan as seen from Weaver's Cave. Franz Kurz zum Thurn und Goldenstein, 1850s.

Weaver Cave (Slovene: Tkalca jama)—also known as Vaulted Cave (Jama pod velbom), Škocjan Cave (Škocjanska jama), and Inlet Cave (Zatočna jama)—is a 2,885 metres (9,465 ft) long ponor cave in southwest Slovenia. It runs from the west (downstream) side of the Rak Škocjan Valley, where it has two entrances, and continues into Planina Cave. It is traversed by Rak Creek, part of the Ljubljanica source system. It thus forms part of the hydrological connection between Cerknica Polje and Planina Polje. Due to sumps, the stream of the Rak is very difficult to follow and was explored by divers only in 1974, when the majority of the cave was discovered in the course of a rescue expedition, and in August 2012.

== History ==
The cave was named after a stalagmite reminiscent of a weaver. An old story says that he was turned to stone because he worked on Sunday, the Lord's Day. The first description of Weaver Cave was published in 1687 by Johann Weikhard von Valvasor in the Philosophical Transactions of the Royal Society. He also published an engraving of it. The cave has also been depicted by other artists, including Franz Goldenstein (1808–1878) in the 1850s. His painting of the Great Natural Bridge of Rak Škocjan as seen from the inside of the cave is on display in the National Gallery of Slovenia.

Carrying the entire runoff of the Rak River out of the Rak Škocjan karst window, Weaver Cave functions as the terminal ponor of a 37 km^{2} catchment that links Lake Cerknica to the Unica springs at Planina Polje. Dye tracer tests and in-cave hydrometric logging confirm that nearly all water entering the cave resurges 2.8 km downstream in Planina Cave, establishing Weaver Cave as the critical choke-point in the Cerknica–Planina groundwater circuit.

A metre-wide constriction 450 m from the entrance throttles flood discharge; when prolonged rain coincides with snowmelt, the restriction backs up water, submerging the valley floor and lifting flood marks up to 19 m above the cave lip—one of the highest karst back-flood signatures recorded in the Dinaric belt. These hydraulics explain why rescue divers who first negotiated the sump network in 1974 found fresh sand banks tens of metres above normal flow and why modern monitoring treats Weaver Cave as the barometer for flood risk in Rak Škocjan.

== Gallery ==
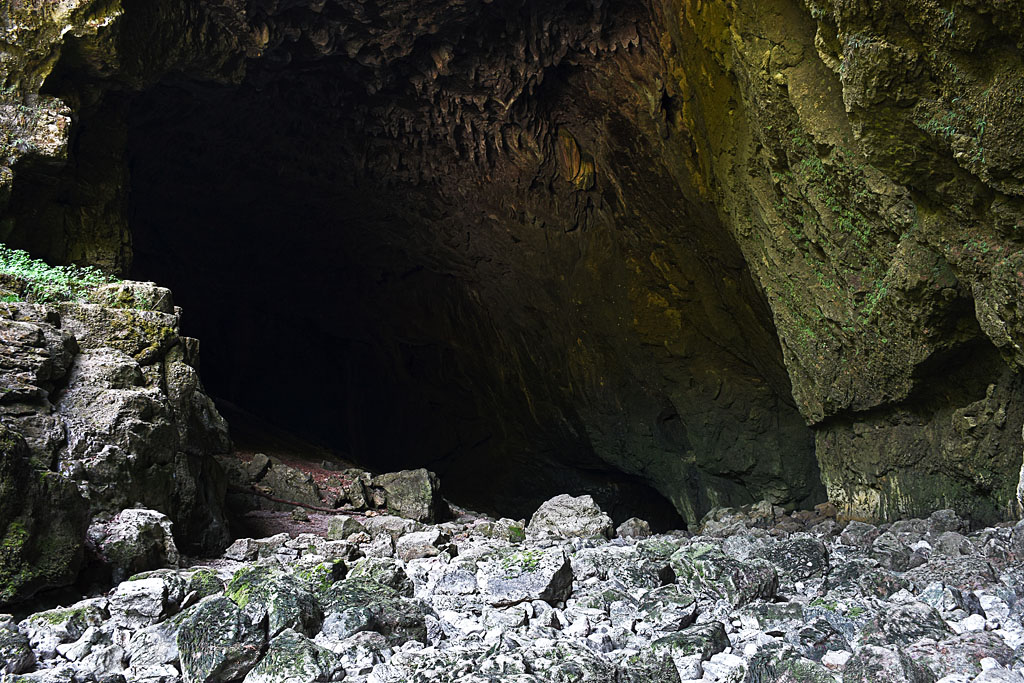
Lower (main) entry

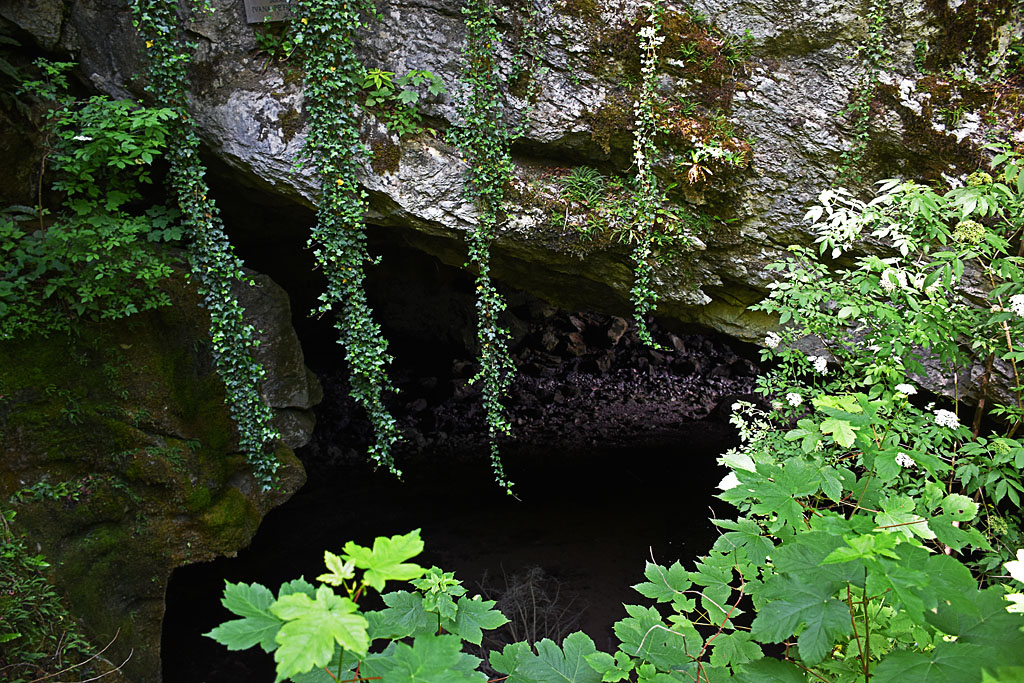
Upper (secondary) entry

== See also ==
- List of deepest Dinaric caves
- List of longest Dinaric caves
