= Unica (river) =

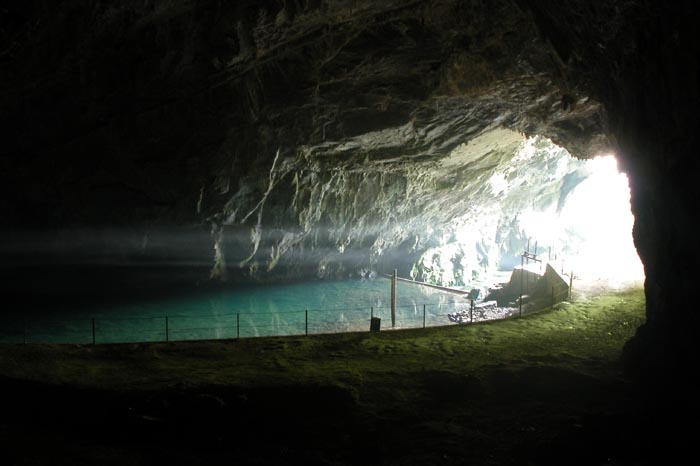
- Unica flows out of the cave

Location
- Country: Slovenia

Physical characteristics
- Source
  - location: Underground confluence of the Pivka and the Rak in Planina Cave
  - coordinates: 45°49′11.17″N 14°14′46.51″E
  - elevation: 500 m (1,600 ft)
- Mouth
  - location: Ljubljanica near Vrhnika
  - elevation: 308 m (1,010 ft) (underground)
- Length: 20 km (12 mi)
- Discharge
  - average: 13 m^{3}/s (460 cu ft/s) (at the source in Planina Cave), 24 m^{3}/s (850 cu ft/s) (at the outflow in Vrhnika)

Basin features
- Progression: Ljubljanica→ Sava→ Danube→ Black Sea

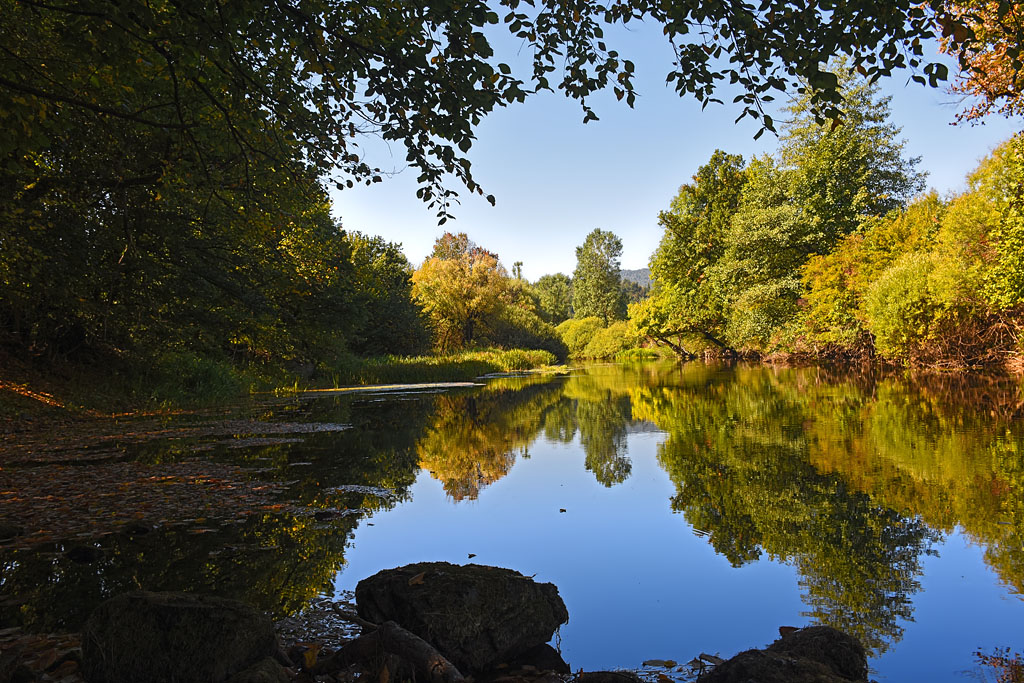
Unica near Haasberg

The Unica is a river in Slovenia. It starts as the underground confluence of the Pivka and the Rak in Planinska jama. This is the largest confluence of underground rivers in Europe. 300 meters (980 ft) further, the Unica emerges near Planina. It flows north through the Planina Karst Field (Planinsko Polje) through the municipalities of Postojna, Cerknica, and Logatec, where it returns underground. It then flows for about another 10 kilometers (6.2 mi) underground, emerging 142 meters (466 ft) lower at multiple springs near Vrhnika to form the Ljubljanica River.
