= Rak Škocjan =

Valley and landscape park in southwestern Slovenia

Coordinates: 45°47′9.14″N 14°17′56.58″E

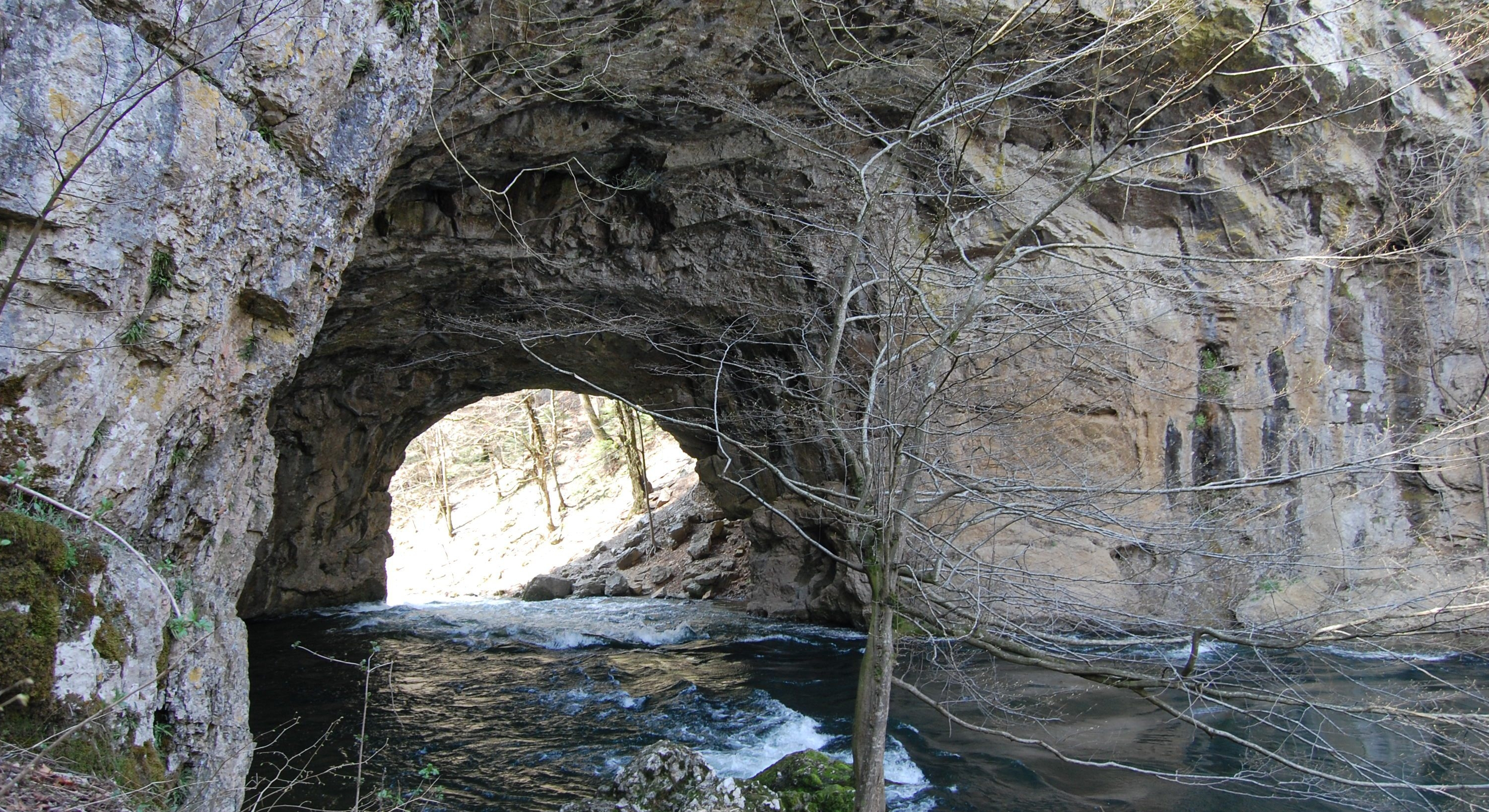
Big Natural Bridge in Rak Škocjan

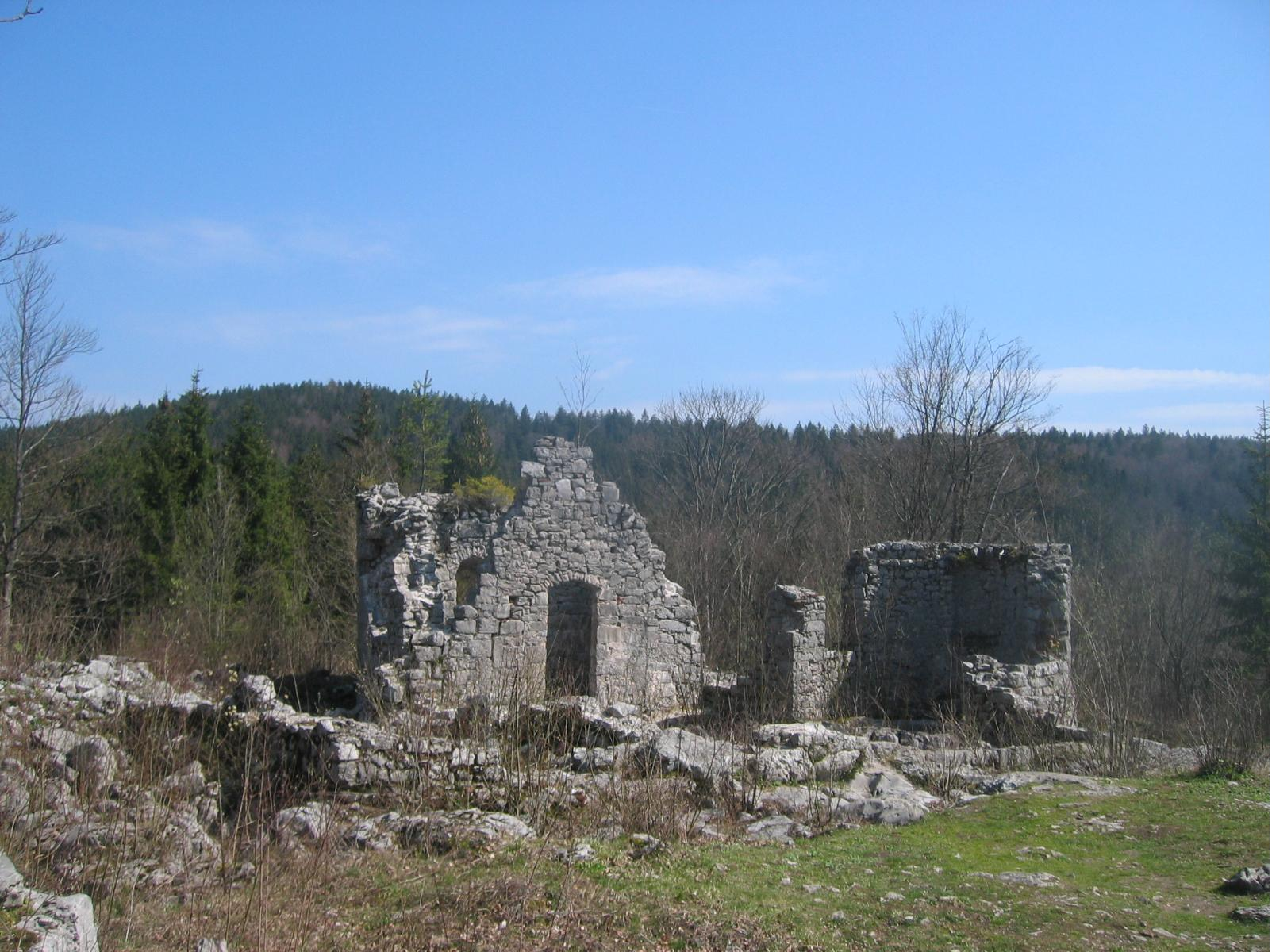
The ruins of St. Cantianus's Church

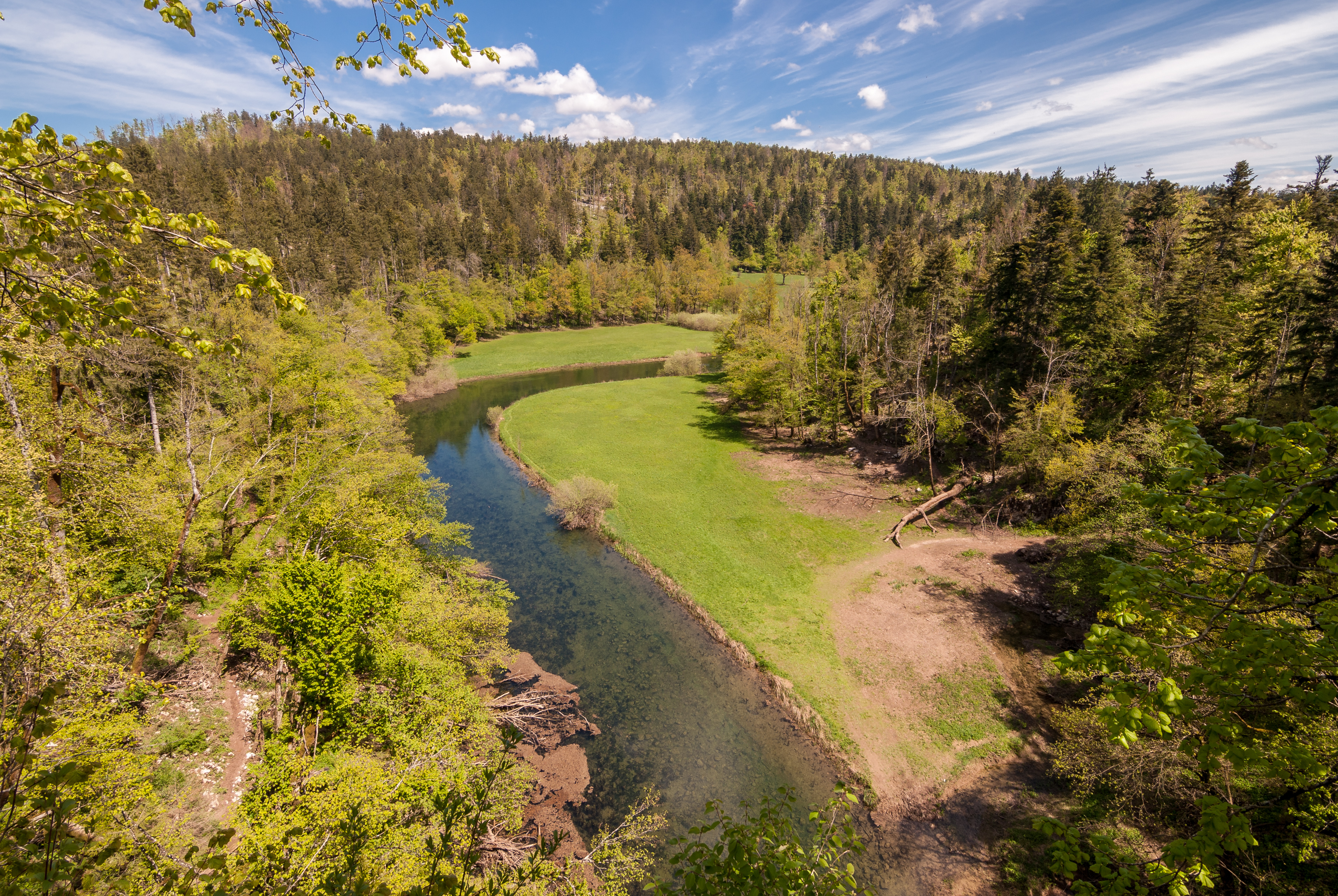
Rak Creek

Rak Škocjan (Slovene: Rakov Škocjan; pronounced [ˈɾaːkɔu̯ ʃkɔˈtsjaːn]) is a valley and a landscape park, part of Inner Carniola Regional Park in southwestern Slovenia. Administratively, it belongs to the settlement of Rakov Škocjan. Rak Škocjan has been protected since 1949 and is the oldest landscape park in Slovenia.

== Geography ==
There are two natural bridges in Rak Škocjan, Little Natural Bridge (Slovene: Mali naravni most) and about 2.5 kilometres (1.6 mi) downstream, to the west, Big Natural Bridge (Slovene: Veliki naravni most). Rak Creek traverses the valley and enters the cave Weaver's Cave at its western side. It reappears again in Planina Cave. Above the valley, in the vicinity of Big Natural Bridge, stand the ruins of St. Cantianus's Church, built in the early 17th century in the late Gothic style. This area is also an Iron Age archaeological site.

The valley itself is enclosed on all sides by sheer cliffs, which can reach as high as 300 m (980 ft).

== Name ==
The name Rakov Škocjan literally means 'Škocjan on Rak Creek'. Like other places named Škocjan, the name is a contraction of *šent Kǫcьjanъ 'Saint Cantianus', referring to the patron saint of the local church. The name of the area is an artificial coinage; the name Rakovska kotlina 'Rak Basin' was initially suggested in 1949. The name Rakov Škocjan 'Rak Škocjan' first appeared in the mid-1960s, and it gradually took hold by the 1980s alongside other names for the area, including Rakova dolina 'Rak Valley' and Dolina Raka 'Rak Valley'. In Slovene, the valley shares its name with the settlement of Rakov Škocjan.

== Gallery ==
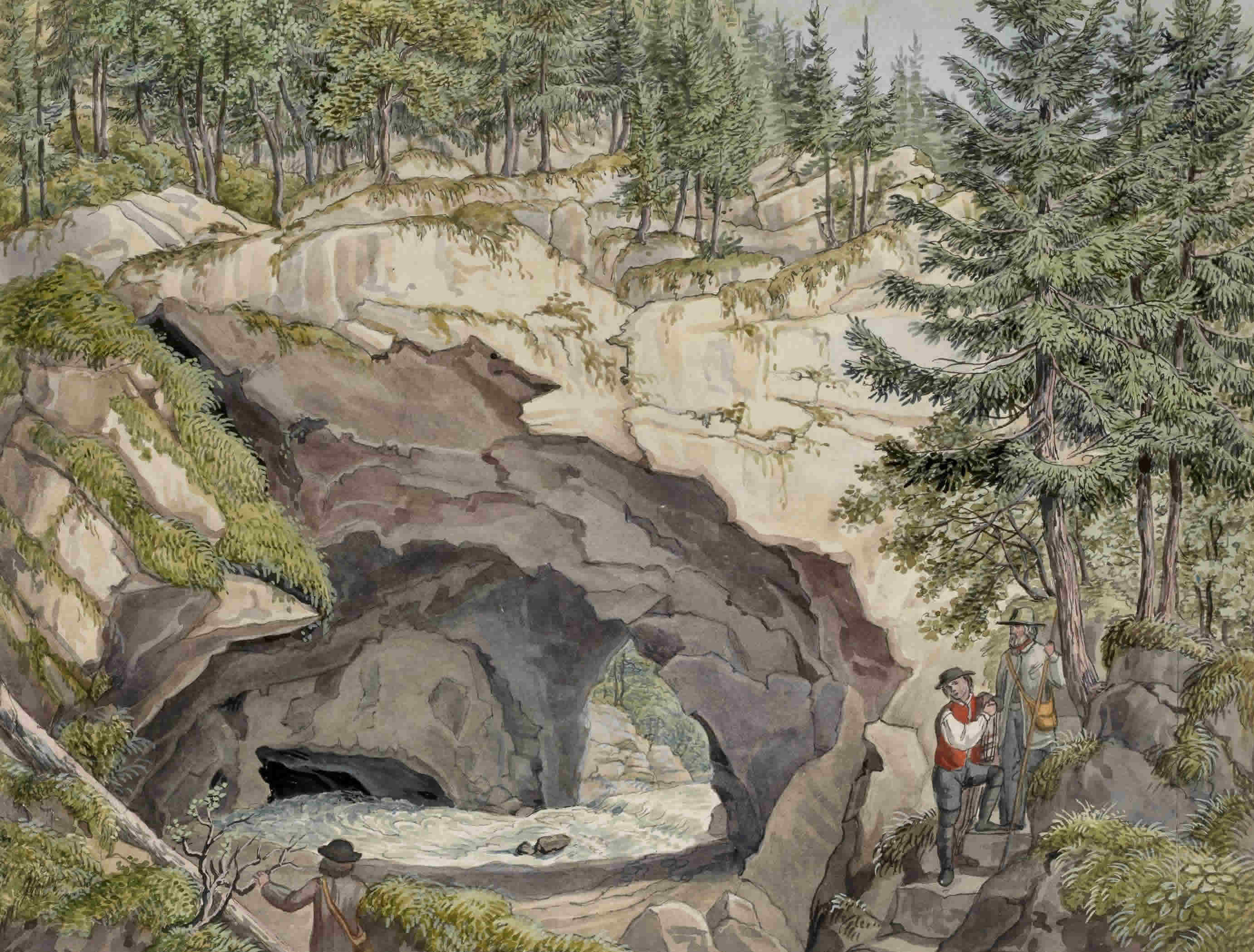
Painting of Rak Škocjan

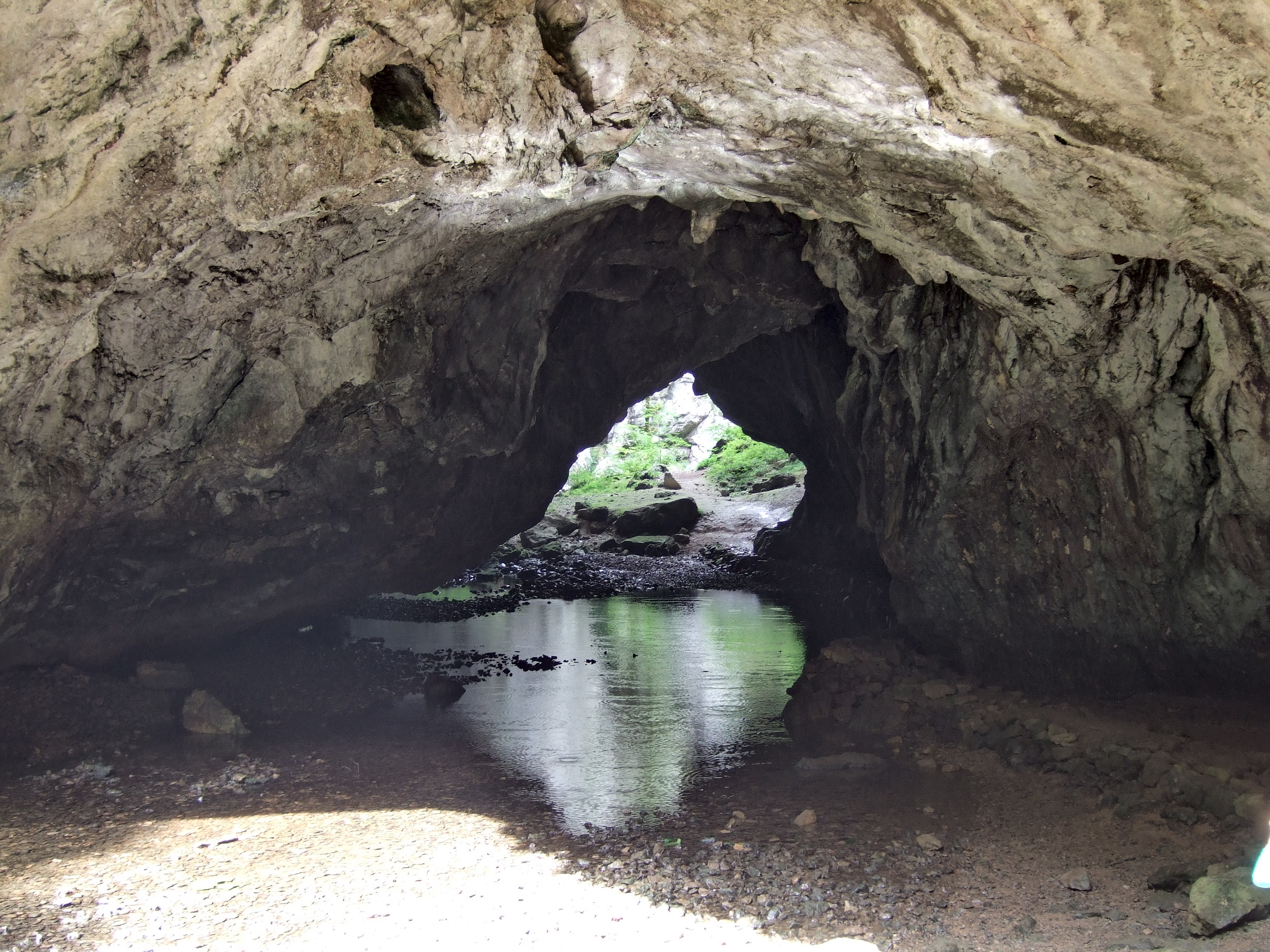
Zelše Caves, upstream view

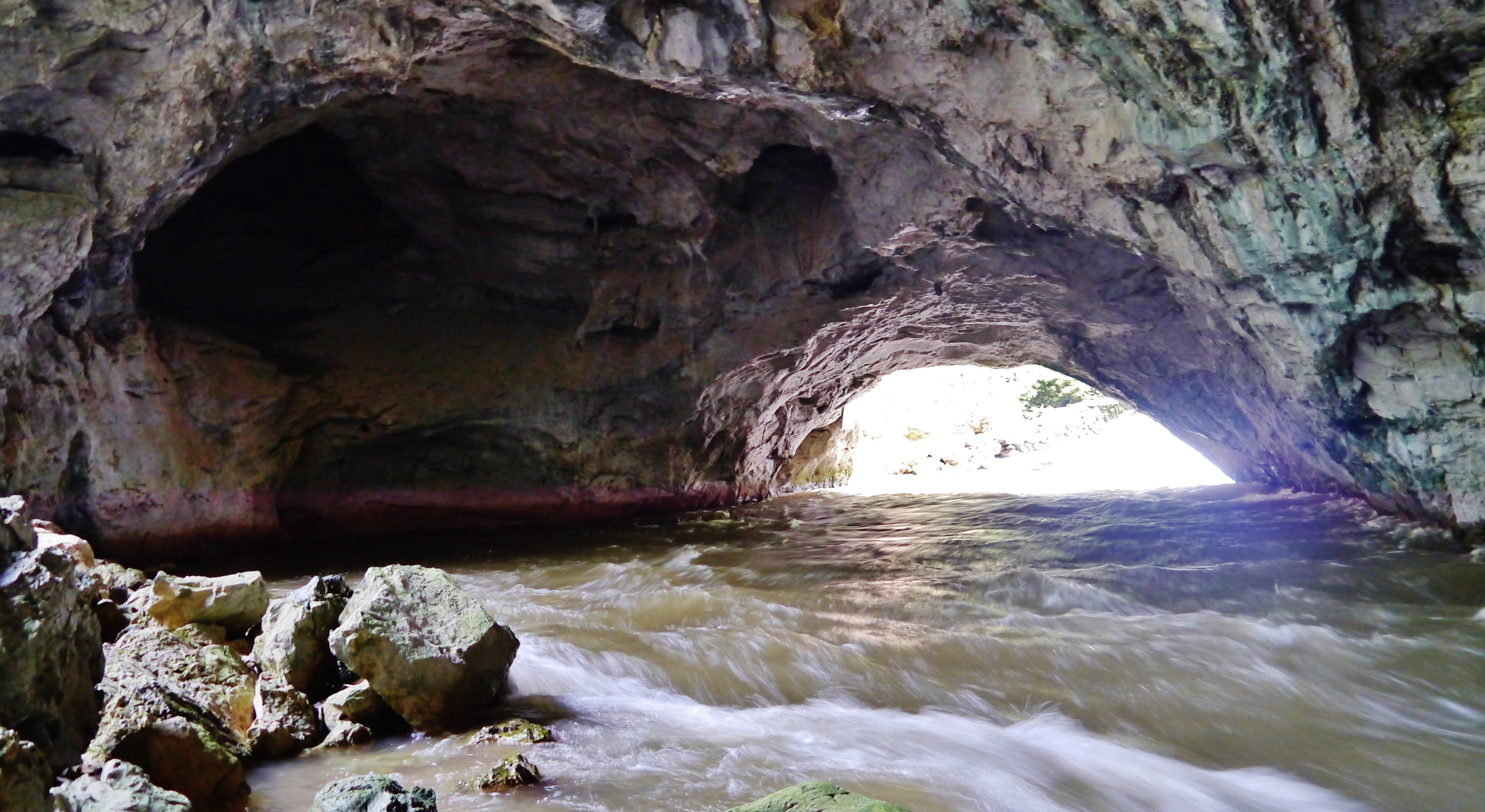
Zelše Caves, upstream view at high water level

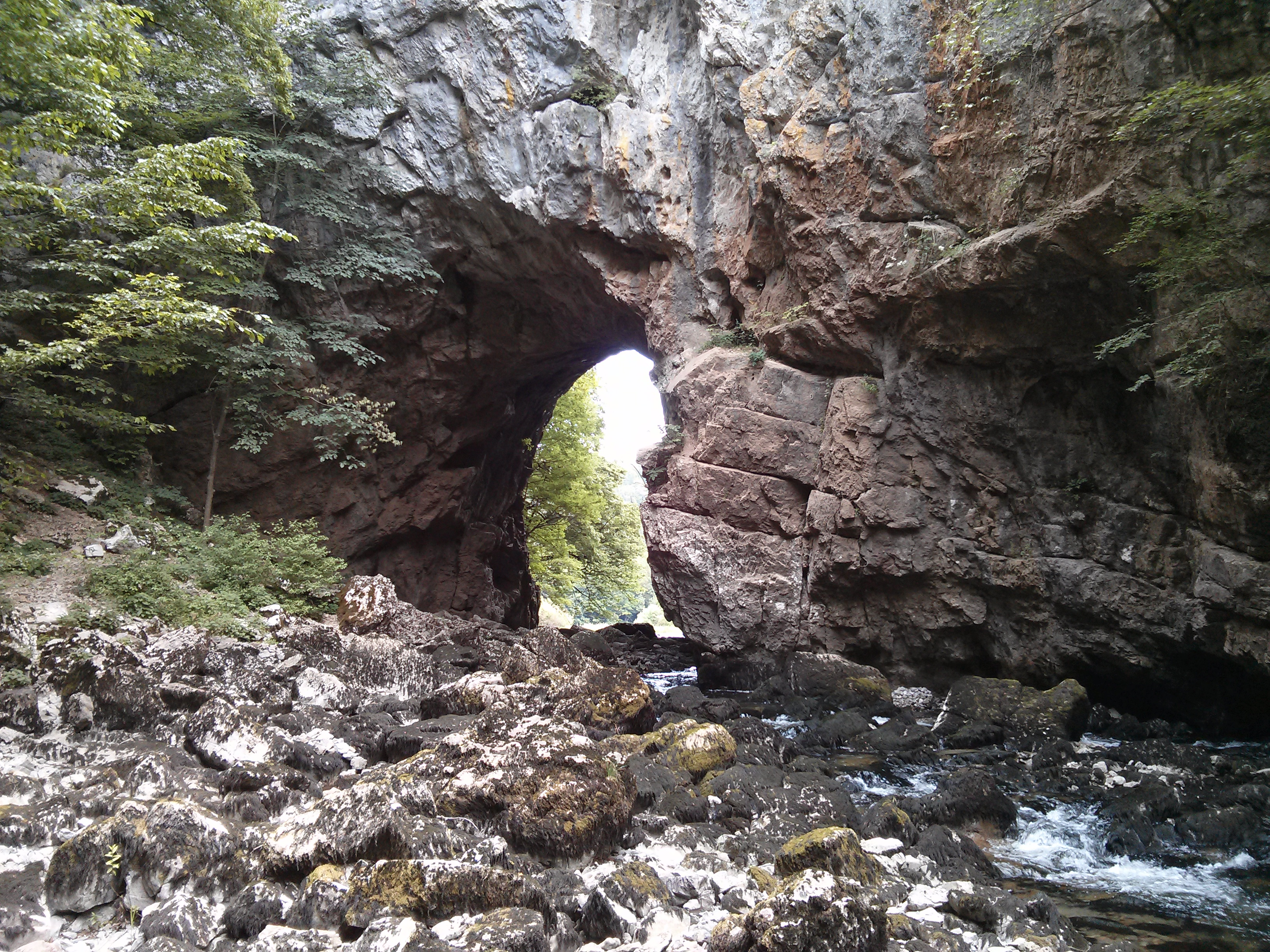
Upstream view of Big Natural Bridge

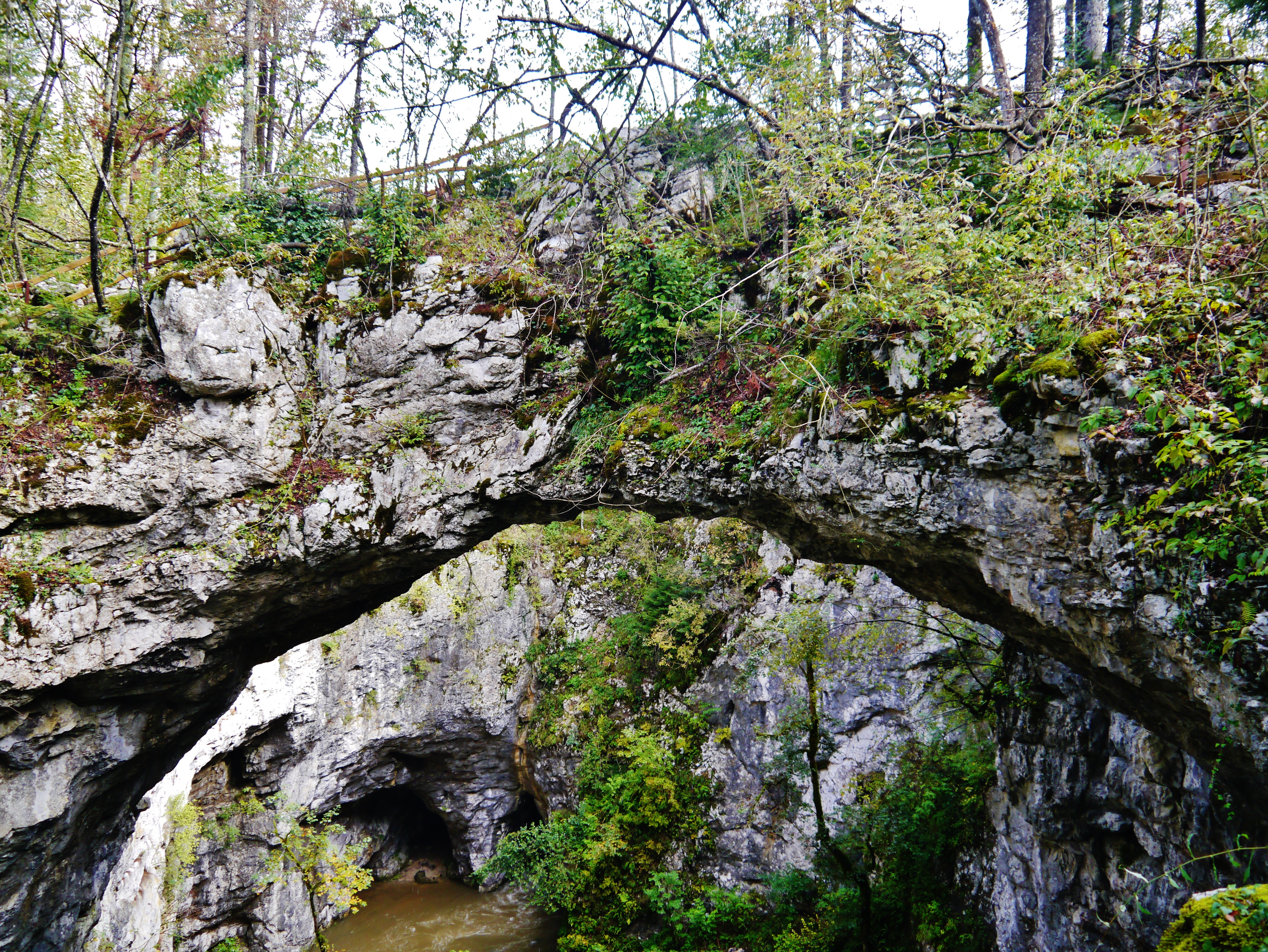
Little Natural Bridge

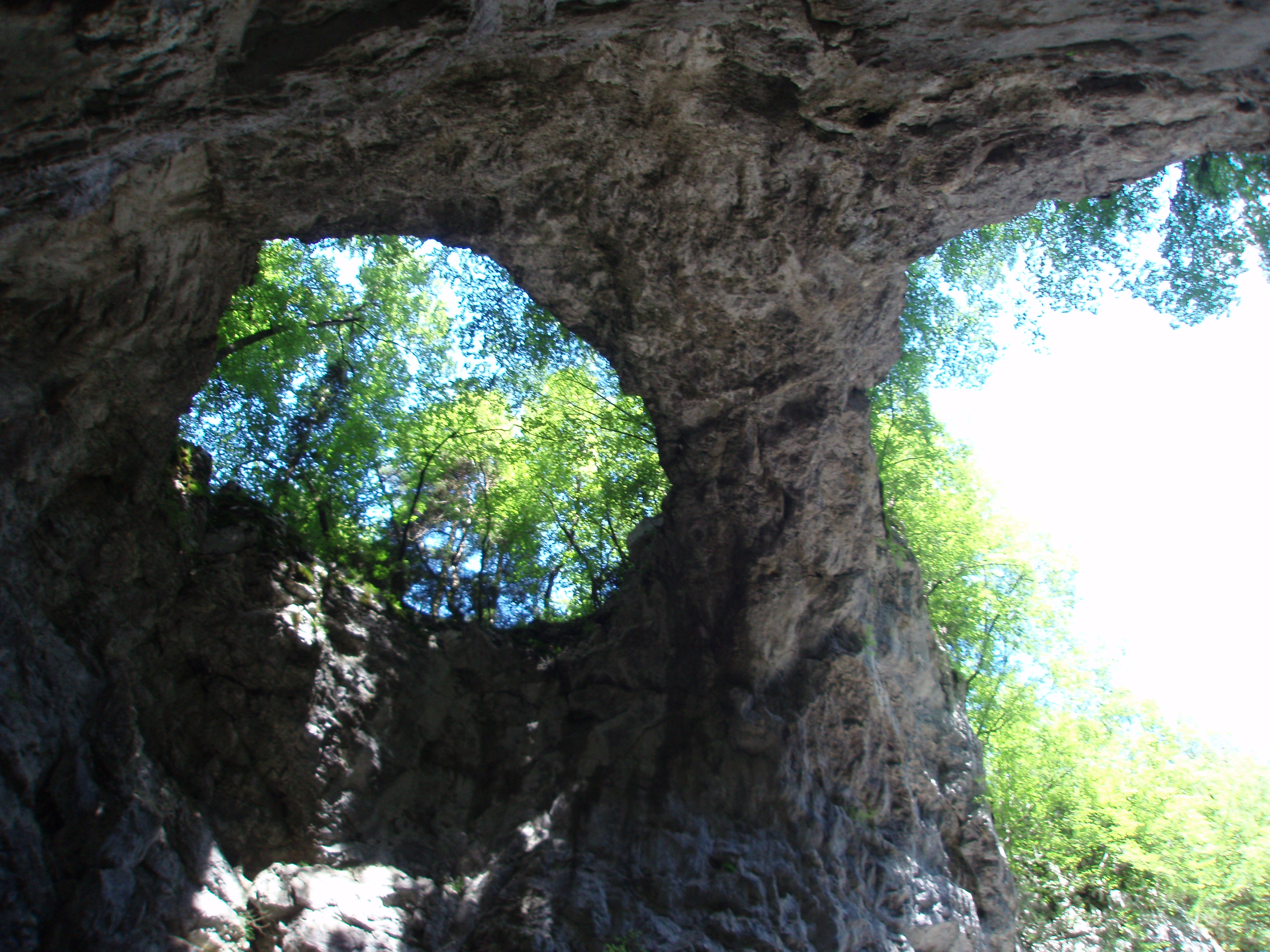
Little Natural Bridge, seen from below

== See also ==
- Škocjan Caves Regional Park
