= Egg decorating in Slavic culture =

Tradition in European cultures

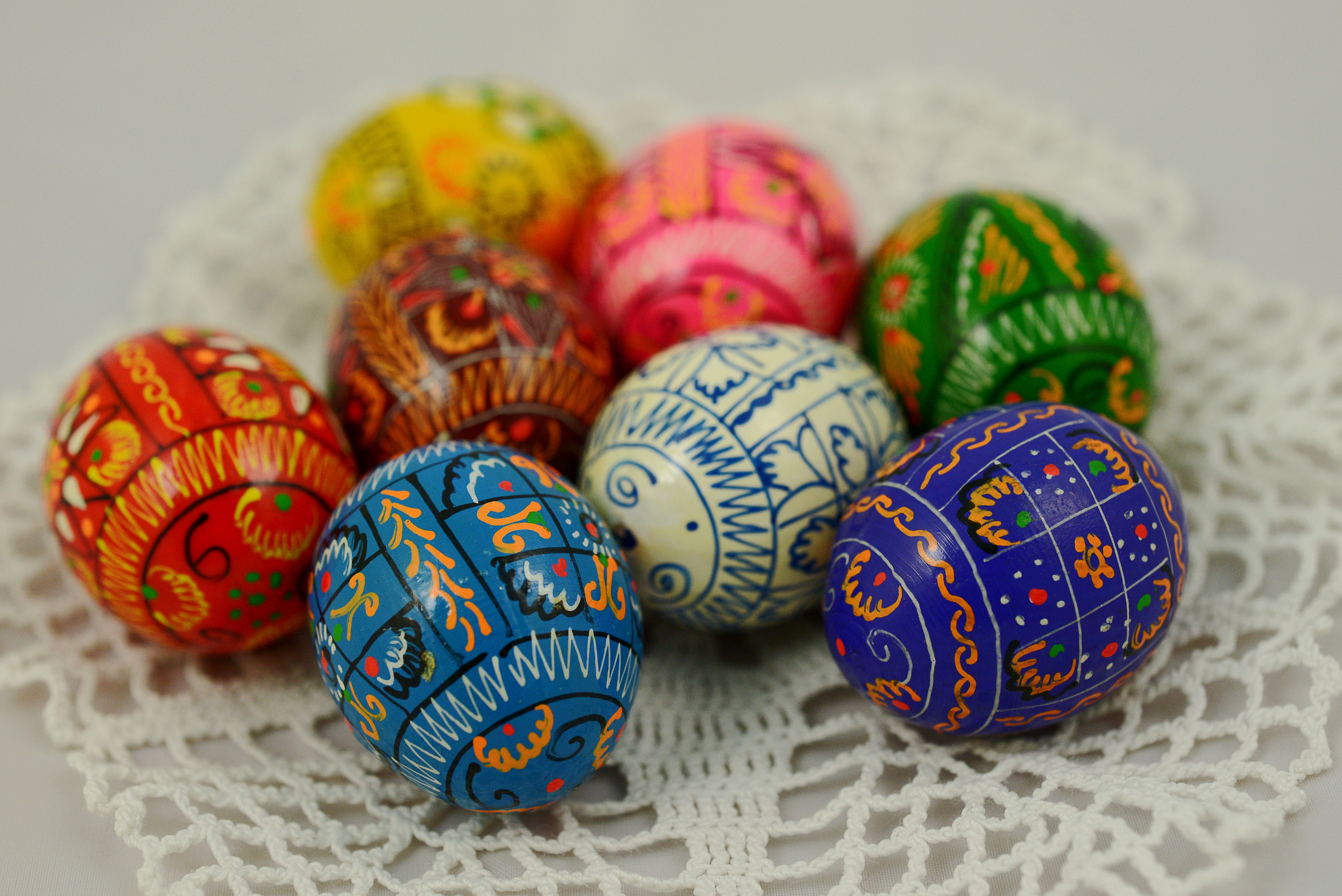
Modern Polish painted wooden pisanka

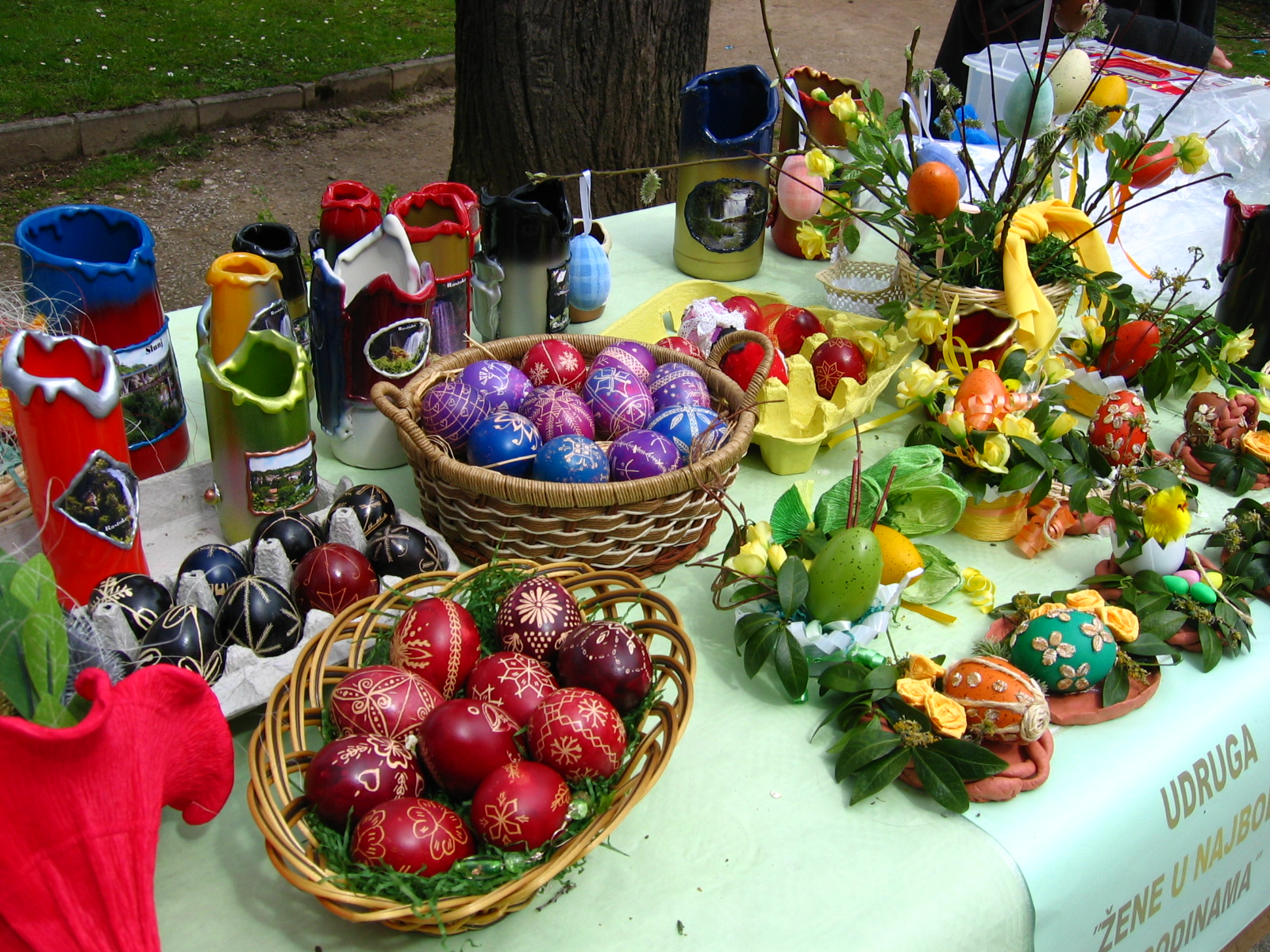
Examples of Croatian pisanica

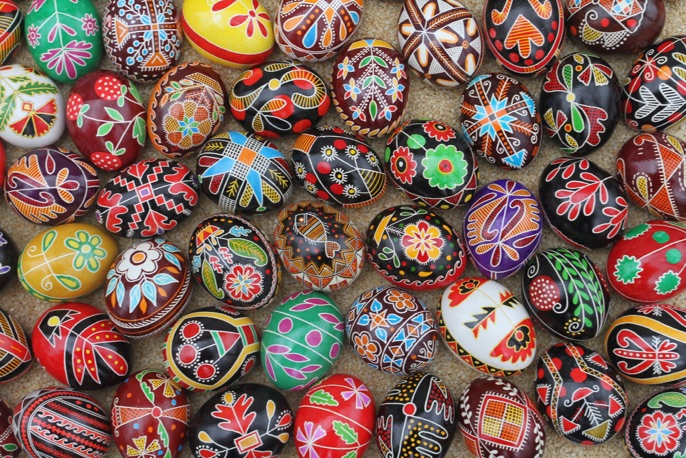
A collection of Ukrainian pysanky with traditional folk designs

The tradition of egg decoration in Slavic cultures originated in pagan times, and was transformed by the process of religious syncretism into the Christian Easter egg. Over time, many new techniques were added. Some versions of these decorated eggs have retained their pagan symbolism, while others have added Christian symbols and motifs.

While decorated eggs of various nations have much in common, national traditions, color preferences, motifs used and preferred techniques vary.

The oldest decorated eggs for were found in Ukraine. The tradition of decorating eggs (especially for Easter) was popularised and is no longer strictly Slavic, known across Europe and also practised in non-Slavic countries, e.g. Britain (since at least the 13th century), Spain, Hungary (hímestojás), Lithuania (margutis), Romania (ouă vopsite, incondeiate or impistrite) and Sweden (måla ägg, since at least the 18th century).

In Central Europe in particular, it developed into a small-scale art form.

== Etymology ==
The names of the various types of Slavic decorated eggs come from the method of decoration, as noted in detailed descriptions below.

Many of the names of wax-resist style eggs derive from the Old Slavonic пьсати which refers to writing or painting.

== By country ==
=== Croatia ===
The word pisanica is derived from the Croatian word that means "writing". The most common phrase put on pisanicas is "Happy Easter" or "Sretan Uskrs". Other common decorations are doves, crosses, flowers, traditional designs, and other slogans wishing health and happiness.

In the Međimurje area, soot would often be mixed with oak to make a dark brown color. Green plants would be used for green dye.

=== Poland ===
The word pisanka is derived from the verb pisać which, in contemporary Polish, means exclusively 'to write' yet, in old Polish, meant also 'to paint'.

Today, in Poland, eggs and pisanki are hallowed on Easter Saturday along with the traditional Easter basket and richly decorated.

On Easter Sunday, before the ceremonial breakfast, these eggs are exchanged and shared among the family at the table. This is a symbol of friendship, similar to the sharing of the Opłatek (Christmas wafer) on Christmas Eve.

=== Slovenia ===
==== Suhorje Easter eggs - pirhi ====
Suhorje Easter eggs, also known in Suhorje as pirhi, were usually hard-boiled hen's eggs dyed with onion skins, which coloured them in various shades of reddish-brown, and with the bark of a Brazilian tree which in Suhorje they called pražilka, which dyed the eggs red. After the egg had been dyed, the makers, mostly female farmers, scratched ornaments into it with a small blade, such as flowers, hearts, and the symbols of faith, hope, and charity. In the 19th century, the making of Suhorje Easter eggs was widespread throughout the Brkini Hills, but later rapidly declined because of people's growing distance from the Catholic Church and the poverty that followed the World War I. After the World War II., because of the new anti-religious authorities, the great majority of villagers stopped making Suhorje Easter eggs for Easter. The tradition was preserved by Antonija Volk Krebelj, farmer and folk artist from Suhorje who continued making them for next decades. She began using new motifs that had not previously appeared on the eggs: geometric motifs, plant motifs, more detailed floral patterns, the burning heart, a heart with the inscription IHS, the Holy Spirit, the lamb, grapes, ears of wheat, little boats, a swallow, and a dove with an olive branch in its beak. She sometimes also scratched inscriptions onto the eggs, mostly devotional ones, but also the personal names of family members and friends, dedications to recipients, and the year in which the egg was made,... After Slovenian independence, she organized various workshops in schools, within her Catholic parish, and at events and exhibitions, where she passed her knowledge on to younger generation. In April 2022, the making of Suhorje Easter eggs was entered in the Register of the Intangible Cultural Heritage of the Republic of Slovenia.

=== Ukraine ===
Egg decoration in Ukraine is widespread and practiced by many; in the premodern era, pysankarstvo was practiced universally outside of big cities (which often had non-Ukrainian populations). Several traditional forms of decoration are common (krashanky, lystovky, pysanky) while others (driapanky, maliovanky, nakleianky) are practiced less often. Newer forms of egg decoration, like biserky (beadwork eggs), travlenky (etched eggs), and rizblenky (cutwork eggs) are more recent additions, but gaining in popularity, although they are generally practiced by professional artisans rather than the general public. In recent years, shrink wrap decals with traditional designs have become a favorite mode of decoration for many.

The pysanka (Ukrainian: писанка, писанки (pl.)) itself, a wax-resist type egg, is one of Ukraine's national symbols, and is known throughout the world. Pysanky imagery occurs often in Ukrainian literature, with Taras Shevchenko comparing a lovely Ukrainian village to a pysanka. Ukrainian Canadians in Canada erected a giant statue of one in Vegreville, Alberta, and were involved in the effort to release several Canadian commemorative pysanky coins.

== History ==
=== Pagan ===
According to many scholars, the art of wax-resist (batik) egg decoration in Slavic cultures probably dates back to the pre-Christian era. They base this on the widespread nature of the practice, and pre-Christian nature of the symbols used. No ancient examples of intact pysanky exist, as the eggshells of domesticated fowl are fragile, but fragments of colored shells with wax-resist decoration on them were unearthed during the archaeological excavations in Ostrówek, Poland (near the city of Opole), where remnants of a Slavic settlement dating to the early Piast dynasty (10–14th centuries) were found.

As in many ancient cultures, many Slavs worshipped a sun god, Dazhboh. The sun was important — it warmed the earth and thus was a source of all life. Eggs decorated with nature symbols became an integral part of spring rituals, serving as benevolent talismans.

In pre-Christian times, Dazhboh was one of the major deities in the Slavic pantheon; birds were the sun god's chosen creations, for they were the only ones who could get near him. Humans could not catch the birds, but they did manage to obtain the eggs the birds laid. Thus, the eggs were magical objects, a source of life. The egg was also honored during rite-of-Spring festivals—it represented the rebirth of the earth. The long, hard winter was over; the earth burst forth and was reborn just as the egg miraculously burst forth with life. The egg therefore, was believed to have special powers.

=== Christian ===
Originating as a pagan tradition, decorated eggs were absorbed by Christianity to become the traditional Easter egg. With the advent of Christianity, via a process of religious syncretism, the symbolism of the egg was changed to represent, not nature's rebirth, but the rebirth of man. Christians embraced the egg symbol and likened it to the tomb from which Christ rose. With the acceptance of Christianity in Slavic lands in around 9th century, the decorated egg, in time, was adapted to play an important role in local rituals of the new religion. Many symbols of the old sun worship survived and were adapted to represent Easter and Christ's Resurrection.

During Holy Week, eggs are dyed in bright colors and decorated by various techniques. On Holy Saturday Slavic Christians, Catholic and Orthodox, go to a late night service carrying a basket with traditional foods, including Easter bread, cheese, butter, meats, and eggs (decorated or plain). During the service, priests bless the food, which will be eaten on Easter morning.

Some of the blessed eggs would be given as gifts to children, relatives, and romantic partners. Others would be set aside for ritual and protective uses. Easter eggs are now considered to both symbolize the revival of nature and the salvation that Christians obtain from the resurrection of Jesus Christ.

=== Ukrainian ===
The Ukrainian name for a wax-resist type egg, pysanka, comes from the verb pysaty (писати), meaning "to write", as the designs are written onto the egg with beeswax, not painted on.

No actual pysanky have been found from Ukraine's prehistoric periods, as eggshells do not preserve well. Cultic ceramic eggs have been discovered in excavations near the village of Luka Vrublivets'ka, during excavations of a Trypillian site (5th to 3rd millennium BC). These eggs were ornamented and in the form of торохкальці (torokhkal'tsi; rattles containing a small stone with which to scare evil spirits away).

Similarly, no actual pysanky from the Kievan Rus' period exist, but stone, clay and bone versions exist and have been excavated in many sites throughout Ukraine. Most common are ceramic eggs decorated with a horsetail plant (сосонка sosonka) pattern in yellow and bright green against a dark background. More than 70 such eggs have been excavated throughout Ukraine, many of them from graves of children and adults. They are thought to be representations of real decorated eggs.

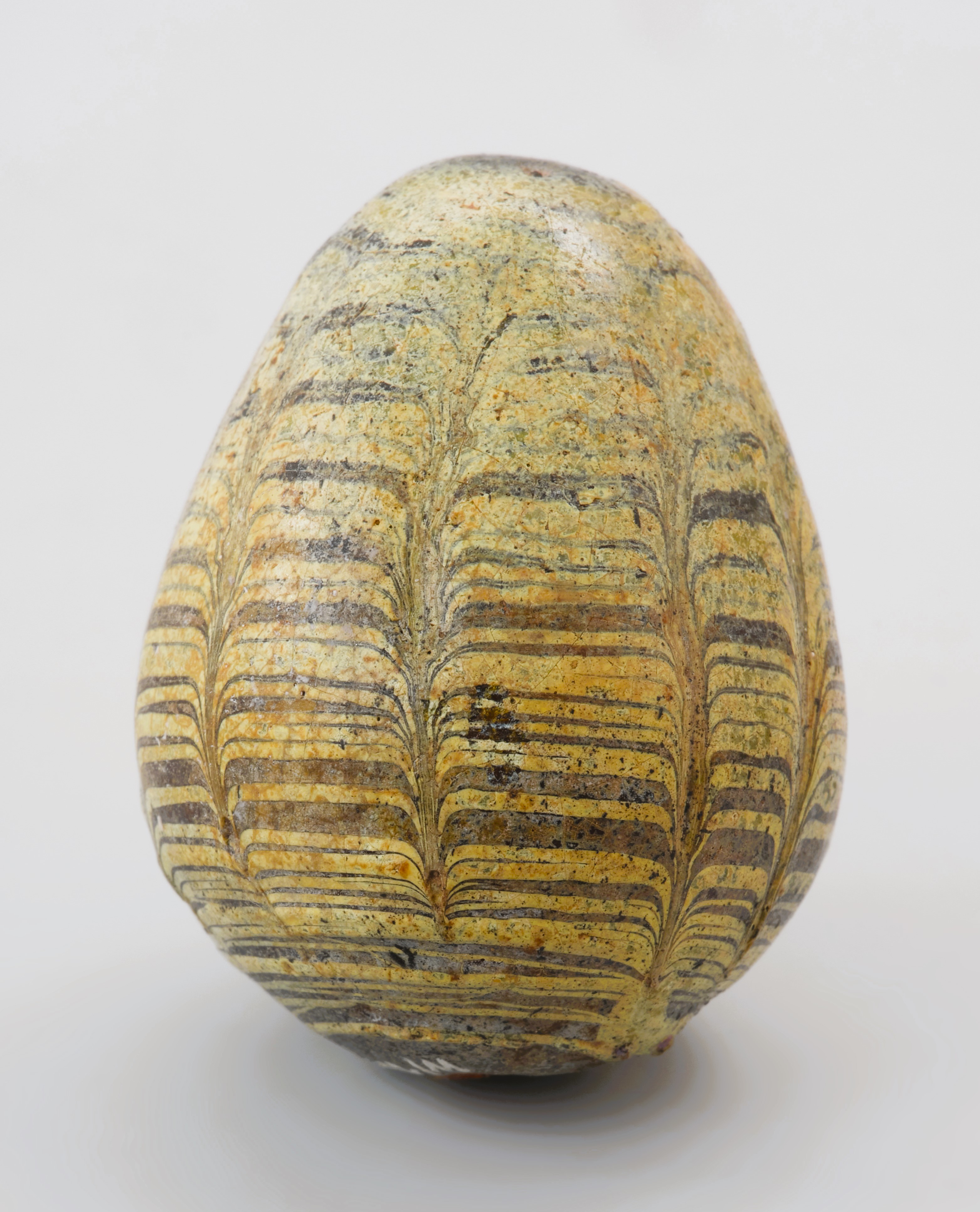
Ceramic egg of the type made in Kievan Rus'. This specimen was found in Cedynia in modern day Poland

These ceramic eggs were common in Kievan Rus' and had a characteristic style. They were slightly smaller than life size (2.5 by 4 cm, or 1 by 1.6 inches) and were created from reddish pink clays by the spiral method. The majolica glazed eggs had a brown, green or yellow background and showed interwoven yellow and green stripes. The eggs were made in large cities like Kyiv and Chernihiv, which had workshops that produced clay tile and bricks; these tiles (and pysanky) were not only used locally but were exported to Poland and to several Scandinavian and Baltic countries.

The oldest "real" pysanka was excavated in Lviv in 2013 and was found in a rainwater collection system that dates to the 15th or 16th century. The pysanka was written on a goose egg, which was discovered largely intact, and the design is that of a wave pattern. The second oldest known pysanka was excavated in Baturyn in 2008 and dates to the end of the 17th century. Baturyn was Hetman Ivan Mazepa's capital, and it was razed in 1708 by the armies of Peter I. A complete (but crushed) pysanka was discovered, a chicken egg shell with geometric designs against a blue-gray background.

The practice of pysankarstvo was widespread throughout Ukrainian ethnographic lands. They were written in every corner of Ukraine, with traditional folk designs being documented by ethnographers well into the late 19th century in every region of Ukraine. This included those Ukrainians resettled within the Russian empire, and into nearby Slavic countries.

In the mid-19th century, as the modern era unfolded, a shift began in the function of the pysanka, from being a ritual object to that of being a decorative one. Pysankarky (women who wrote pysanky) in the Carpathian Mountains (mostly Hutsuls, but Bukovinian Ukrainians and Pokuttians as well) began mass producing pysanky and taking them to nearby towns to sell at Easter. This practice proved profitable, and Ukrainian pysanky began to appear in markets throughout western Ukraine and the rest of the Austro-Hungarian Empire, including major cities like Vienna and Budapest.

In modern times, the art of pysankarstvo was carried abroad by Ukrainian emigrants to North and South America, western Europe, and Australia, where the custom took hold; the practice was concurrently suppressed in Ukraine by the Soviet regime, where it was considered a religious practice nearly forgotten. Museum collections were destroyed both by war and by Soviet cadres. Small areas of folk pysankarstvo survived in Ukraine, in the Cherkasy Oblast and in Northern Bukovina, Hutsulshchyna and Pokuttia, as well as among the Lemkos in neighboring Poland and Slovakia.

Since Ukrainian Independence in 1991, there has been a rebirth of this folk art in its homeland, including a renewal of interest in the preservation of traditional designs and research into its symbolism and history. The Russian invasion of Ukraine in 2022 sparked increased interest in pysankarstvo, both in Ukraine, where patriotic motifs have become more common, and abroad, where interest in Ukrainian culture has dramatically increased.

== Types ==
There are many types of decorated eggs produced in Slavic culture, and their names are usually based on the techniques used to prepare them.

The most universal type of egg decoration in Slavic countries is the krashanka, a simple boiled egg dyed a single color. Before modern chemical dyes became common, women would use natural botanical dyestuffs to make the dyes. The most common color for krashanky was red, usually obtained from onion skins. Krashanky were made to be blessed and eaten, although they were involved in games on Easter and sometimes used for ritual purposes.

The most common form of egg decoration in Slavic culture, beyond simple single color krashanky, utilizes the process of wax-resist dyeing similar to batik. A tool similar to a canting called a "kistka" is used to apply hot wax to the shell of an egg, which is then placed in a series of dye baths. The wax prevents the dye from reaching the surface of the egg; multiple layers of wax and color may be applied to build the pattern which is then revealed when the wax is removed (by melting it off) at the end.

Wax-resist type eggs (pysanky) had ritual purposes: the calling out of spring, ensuring fertility, or protection. The eggs were left intact, as there was magic within the egg itself, and allowed to dry out over time. In modern times, these eggs are usually meant to be decorative objects of art, rather than magical amulets, and the egg yolk and white are usually removed by blowing them out through a small hole in the egg.

Other techniques were more regional, and include a "scratch" technique, where dye is applied to an egg and then patterns scratched onto the shell; painted eggs, where the shells are painted using a brush; and various versions of appliqué, where items (straw, paper, beads, sequins) are glued to the shell of an egg.

=== Krashanky ===
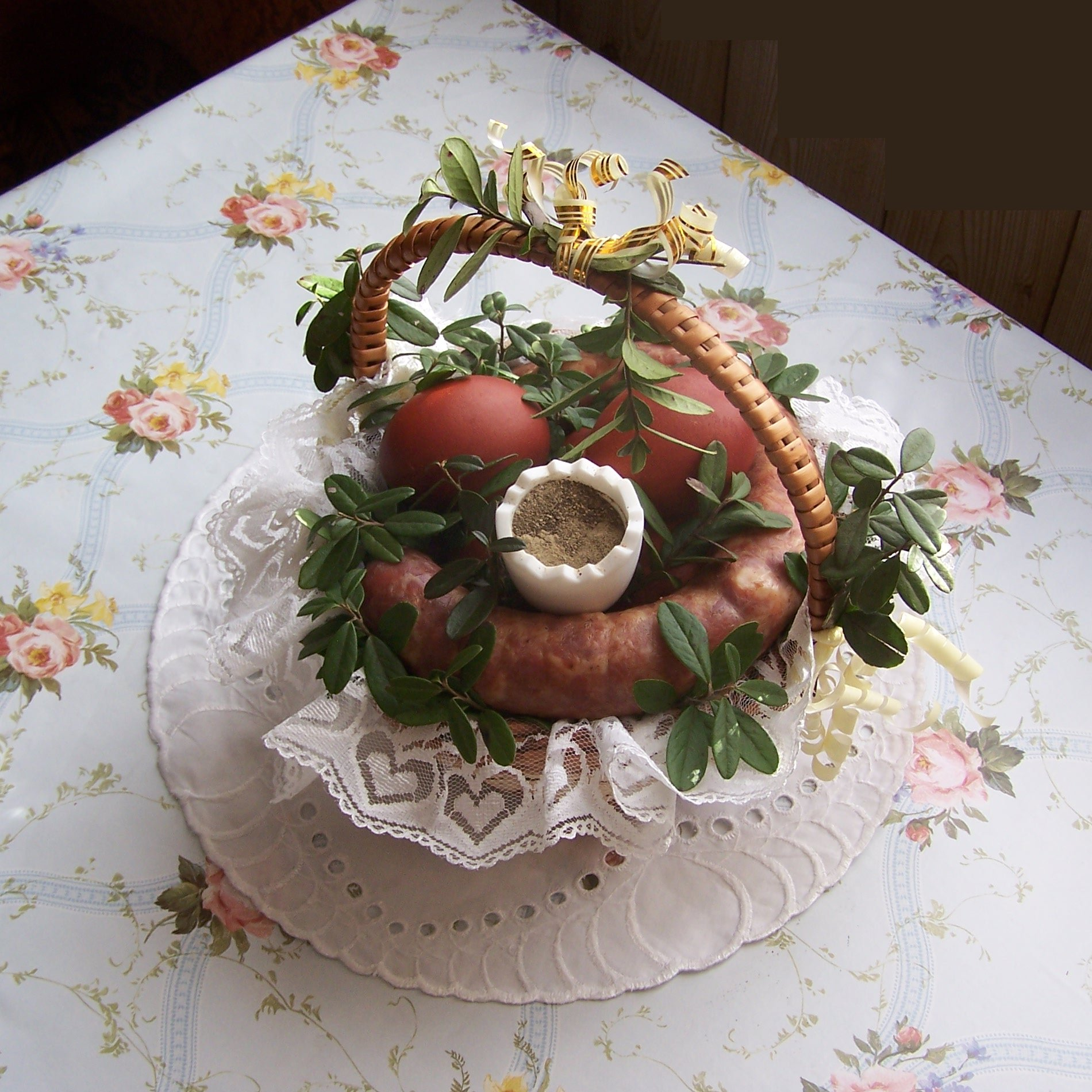
Traditional Polish onion skin kraszanki

Krashanky (in Ukraine) — from krasyty (красити), "to decorate", known in Poland as "kraszanki" or byczki — are simple colored hard boiled eggs, and intended to be eaten after being blessed in church on Easter. They were traditionally made by boiling an egg in a decoction of plants or other natural products, usually onion skins, which cooks and dyes them a single color. The colour of krashanka depends on the dyestuff used:

- dark red/brown: — onion skins;
- black: — oak or alder bark or walnut shells;
- gold: — apple tree bark or marigold flowers;
- violet: — mallow flower petals;
- green: — rye shoots or periwinkle leaves;
- pink: — beet juice

In the modern era, they are made using store bought food safe dyes, much like western Easter eggs.

Children would play various games on Easter with krashanky, including having krashanka battles, where one participant would hold an egg still in their hand, while another would hit it straight on with their own—both eggs pointed end to pointed end. The person whose egg cracked would lose the battle, and the winner would keep it as a prize.

In Ukraine krashanky, like pysanky, had talismanic powers. The krashanky themselves, particularly those which had been blessed, were holy and could not be trampled upon — to do so would bring bad luck. Girls would wash themselves in water in which a blessed krashanka had been placed to make themselves more beautiful. Krashanky were placed on graves on Provody, the Sunday after Easter. In some regions of Ukraine, they were used to promote crop fertility — krashanky were buried in the grain fields to promote good growth. Krashanky were also buried in vegetable gardens at such places where they would not be trodden on, to chase away pests and for vegetables to grow thick. The shells of krashanky could not simply be thrown out:, lest a witch get ahold of them and use them for evil purposes; instead, they were fed to the chickens to help them lay, saved to smoke out fevers, or tossed in a river to send them to the Rakhmany, so as to let them know Easter had arrived in the land.

=== Lystovky ===
In Ukraine, lystovky—from lystia (листя), "leaves"—are created by dyeing an egg on which small leaves or flowers have been attached, and kept in place by wrapping the egg in muslin. The egg is then dyed, the cloth and plant material removed, and images remain in white of the leaves/flowers. These are similar to British Pace eggs.

=== Krapanky ===
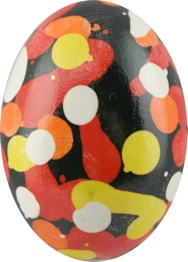
Ukrainian Krapanka

Known as krapanky—from krapka (крапка), "a dot"—in Ukraine and as krapianki in Poland, these are raw eggs decorated using the wax-resist method, traditionally created by dripping molten wax from a beeswax candle onto an egg or daubing it on with a stick (often the handle of a pysachok). This results in an egg with only dots or spots as ornamentation (i.e. without symbols or other drawings). They can be considered the simplest version of a pysanka, or a "proto-pysanka".

=== Pysanky ===
Pysanka, Ukrainian tradition and art of decorating eggs
- UNESCO Intangible Cultural Heritage
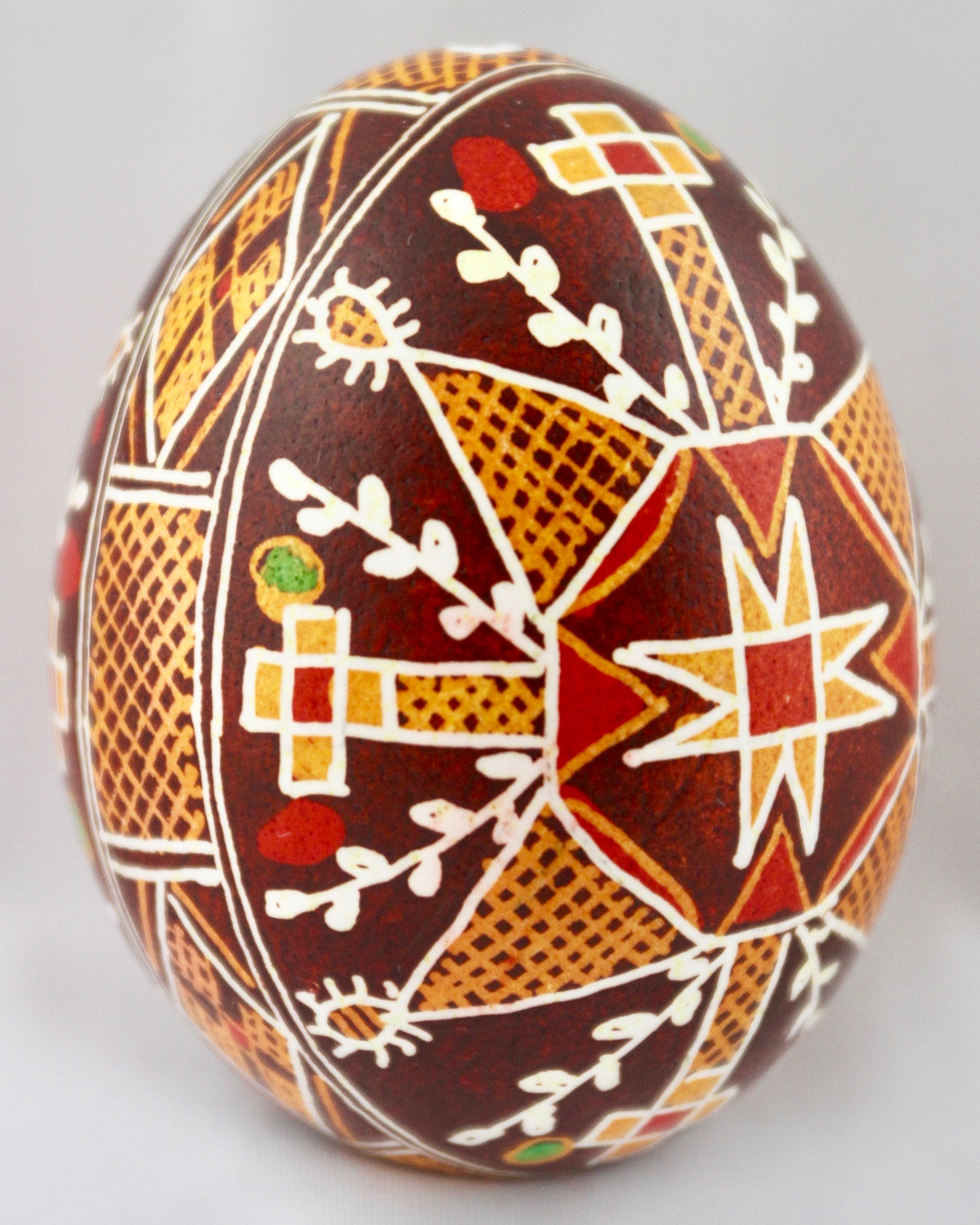
- Ukrainian folk pysanka from the Pokuttia region
- Country: Ukraine and Estonia
- Reference: 02134
- Region: Europe and North America

Inscription history
- Inscription: 2024 (19th session)
- List: Representative

Known as pysanky—from pysaty (писати), "to write"—in Ukraine and as pisanki in Poland, they are eggs decorated using the wax-resist method (resist dyeing). The words pisanki/pysanky are sometimes used to describe any type of decorated egg, but they traditionally referred to an egg created by the wax batik method and utilizing traditional folk motifs and designs. The designs are "written" in hot wax. While the wax-resist eggs of the various Slavic nationalities may appear somewhat similar, they can be differentiated by color schemes, divisions used, and motifs.

The linear batik type of pysanka is made with a special tool, a stylus, called in Ukraine a pysachok (писачок), pysal'tse (писальце) or, less commonly, a kystka (кистка). This tool has a small metal funnel attached to a wooden handle; the molten wax can be written with it, much like a pen. The tips vary in size: fine tips are used to write fine details, medium tips are used for writing most lines, while wide tips are used for thick lines or for coloring in areas.

In some regions, "drop-pull" eggs, a variation on wax-resist, are more common. These use a simple pin or nail head to apply wax to the eggshell instead of a special tool, resulting in designs composed of dots, tears and commas.

In Lusatia, in addition to traditional linear batik and drop-pull, jejka pisać are created to which wax is applied using feathers which have been cut into shapes: diamonds, triangles, tear shapes, etc.

Many other Slavic ethnic groups create eggs decorated using the wax-resist method, including the Belarusians (пісанка, pisanka), Bulgarians (писано яйце, pisano yaytse), Carpatho-Rusyns (писанкы, pysankŷ), Croats (pisanica), Czechs (kraslice), Macedonians (вапцано јајце, vapcano jajce), Serbs (писаница / pisanica), Slovaks (kraslica), Slovenes (pisanica, pirhi or remenke), and Sorbs (jejka pisać).

Wooden eggs and beaded eggs are often incorrectly referred to as "pysanky" because they mimic the decorative style of pysanky in a different medium.

=== Driapanky ===
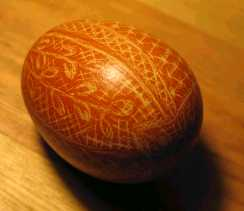
Drapanka with reddish dye

Known as driapanky—from driapaty (дряпати), "to scratch"—in Ukraine and as drapanki or skrobanki in Poland, these are made by scratching the surface of a dyed egg with a sharp tool to reveal the white of the egg shell. Driapanky can be created with either cooked (krashanky) or uncooked eggs. This is a traditional folk technique of egg decoration in Ukraine; Kulzhynskyi gives many examples in his 1899 catalog.

Scratchwork is a common form of egg decoration in many western Slavic countries, and can be found among the Czechs, Hungarians, Lithuanians, Poles, Slovaks, Sorbians (German Slavs) and Ukrainians. Czech Scratchwork eggs are noted for often being multicolored (small areas of color are painted on, using a brush to apply dye), while Sorbian eggs often include text in addition to floral and geometric motifs.

=== Pacenki ===
In Poland, pacenki are created in a manner similar to the sgraffito technique, by waxing eggs and then etching away the unwaxed areas. Traditional technique requires the egg shell to be covered with a layer of molten wax in which the pattern is scratched. The egg is then submerged into a dye. Finally, the wax preventing the dye to adhere to the eggshell is removed. Thus, the pattern is created.

=== Travlenky ===
In Ukraine, travlenky—from travlennia (травлення), "etching"—are created by using an acid like vinegar or sauerkraut juice to etch back down to the original white surface of the egg. Traditionally, it was used to create "white pysanky," eggs written as pysanky but then etched as a final step to produce a white background. In modern times, this technique is often used on brown chicken eggs as well as on goose eggs; in the latter type, the result is either a monochromatic white egg with areas of relief, or the background can be dyed before wax removal to provide a color contrast.

=== Maliovanky ===
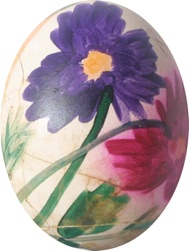
Bukovinian maliovanka

Known as maliovanky—from maliuvaty (малювати), "to paint"—in Ukraine and as malowanki in Poland, they are created by painting a design onto a raw egg with a brush, using paints. Maliovanky have been created using all sorts of paints – watercolor, tempera, oil, acrylic. This term is also used to describe those eggs decorated using a pen and ink, and today includes eggs decorated using markers of all sorts.

Maliovanky were never very common in Ukraine, but they did exist in many regions. In his 1899 catalog, Kulzhynsky documents examples of maliovanky (or "maliovani pysanky," as he called them) in the collection of the Skarzhynska museum from the Voronezh, Kursk, Kharkiv and Poltava gubernias. In the postwar period, maliovanky were produced in Bukovina and sold in the Easter markets there.

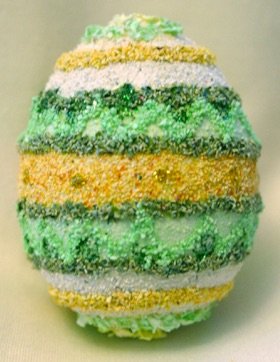
Ukrainian nakleianka made with ground, dyed grain

=== Nakleianky ===
Known as nakleianky—from kleity (клеїти), "to glue on"—in Ukraine and as naklejanki or nalepianki in Poland, they are created by glueing objects to the surface of an egg. Traditionally, Polish naklejani were decorated with petals of elderberry, scraps of colourful paper (including wycinanki) or with patches of cloth. These are popular in Łowicz, Poland, and the surrounding area.

A variation of this technique involves applying cut, flattened, and often dyed pieces of straw to create patterns. Kulzhynskyi, in his 1899 catalog, gives an example from the Ukrainian town of Orzhytsia in Poltava gubernia; this type of egg is called a solomianka. This form of egg decoration is popular in the Czech Republic as well.

Another type of Ukrainian nakleianka utilizes grain, ground up into fine particles. It is glued to either a white or colored egg, and can be natural or dyed. In the modern era sequins, rickrack, small icons and colored string are also used.

=== Oklejanki ===
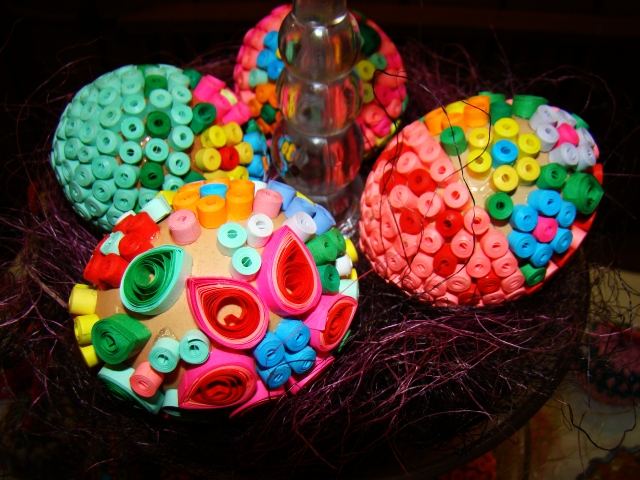
Modern Polish oklejanki or wyklejanki

In Poland, oklejanki or wyklejanki are eggs decorated with bulrush pith and colored yarn. Bulrushes are gathered in early spring, slit lengthwise, and the pith is removed and dried. The pith strips are then glued in various patterns to emptied eggs. Yarn is often incorporated into the design for color. This type of egg decoration is common in the Podlaskie region of Poland.

=== Drotarne Kraslice ===
Drotarne Kraslice are eggs which have been wrapped with wire, and are found in both Czech Republic and Slovakia. This type of egg decoration is unusual in that it was practiced solely by men, to show off their tinkering skills. The wire is looped to form a netting around the egg

=== Biserky ===
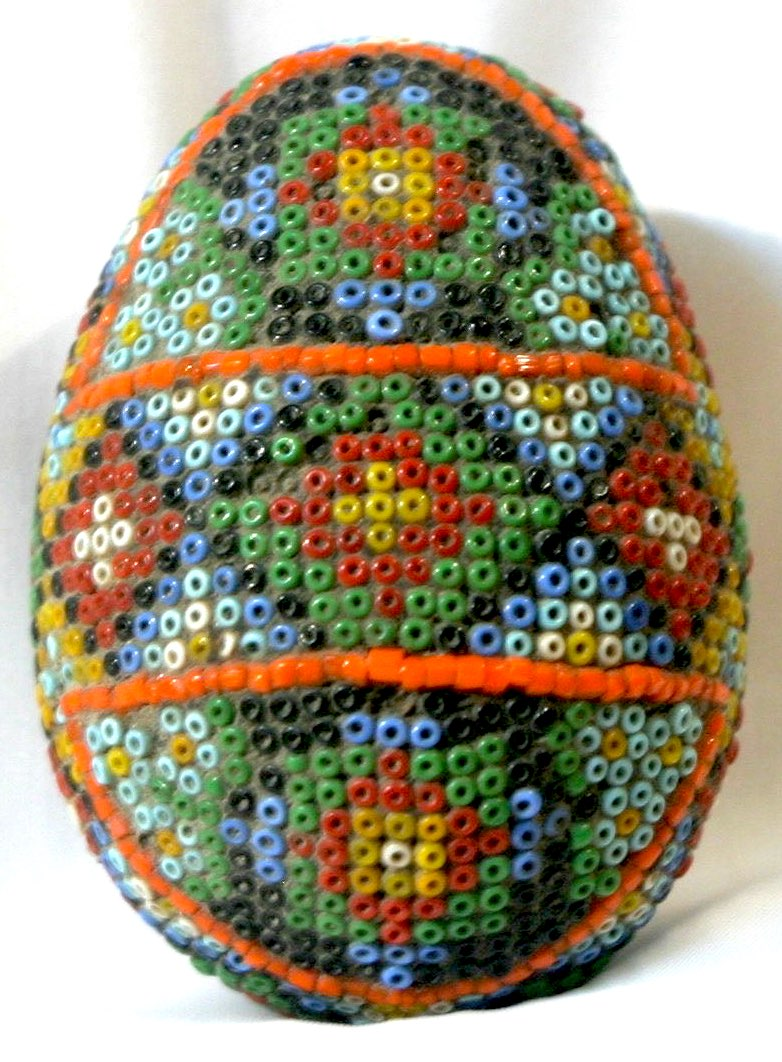
Ukrainian Biserka, decorated with beads and wax

In Ukraine, biserky—from biser (бісер), "beads"—were traditionally created by coating an egg with beeswax, and then embedding beads into the wax to create geometric designs. The practice originated in Romania, and was taken up by Ukrainian nuns in Ukrainian Bukovyna. In modern times, there are many varieties of beaded eggs, with the beads either glued on or formed into a beadwork netting around the egg, in the manner of a gerdan (ґердан).

=== Rizblenky ===
In Ukraine, rizblenky—from rizbyty (різьбити), "to cut, to carve"—are created by drilling the surface of an egg to create cut out areas. This is a modern technique imported from the west. Many such eggs also incorporate acid etching techniques.

=== Linyvky ===
In Ukraine, linyvky—from linyvyi (лінивий), "lazy"—is a joking term to describe eggs decorated using stickers or shrink-wrap sleeves. The latter technique has become quite popular in recent years, with sleeves available for all tastes, some mimicking traditional designs, some with Petrykivka style decoration, and others quite modern and topical.

== Ukrainian pysanka legends ==
The Hutsuls—ethnic Ukrainians who live in the Carpathian Mountain highlands in western Ukraine—believe that the fate of the world depends upon the pysanka. As long as the egg writing custom continues, the world will exist. If, for any reason, this custom is abandoned, evil—in the shape of a horrible serpent who is forever chained to a cliff—will overrun the world. Each year the serpent sends out his minions to see how many pysanky have been written. If the number is low the serpent's chains are loosened and he is free to wander the earth causing havoc and destruction. If, on the other hand, the number of pysanky has increased, the chains are tightened and good triumphs over evil for yet another year.

Newer legends blended folklore and Christian beliefs and firmly attached the egg to the Easter celebration. One legend concerns the Virgin Mary. It tells of the time Mary gave eggs to the soldiers at the cross. She entreated them to be less cruel to her son and wept. The tears of Mary fell upon the eggs, spotting them with dots of brilliant color.

Another legend tells of when Mary Magdalene went to the sepulchre to anoint the body of Jesus. She had with her a basket of eggs to serve as a repast. When she arrived at the sepulchre and uncovered the eggs, the pure white shells had miraculously taken on a rainbow of colors.

A common legend tells of Simon the peddler, who helped Jesus carry his cross on the way to Calvary. He had left his goods at the side of the road, and, when he returned, the eggs had all turned into intricately decorated pysanky.

== Ukrainian superstitions and folk beliefs ==
Many superstitions were attached to Ukrainian pysanky. Pysanky were thought to protect households from evil spirits, catastrophe, lightning and fires. Pysanky with spiral motifs were the most powerful, as the demons and other unholy creatures would be trapped within the spirals forever. A blessed pysanka could be used to find demons hidden in the dark corners of your house.

Pysanky held powerful magic, and had to be disposed of properly, lest a witch get a hold of one. She could use the shell to gather dew, and use the gathered dew to dry up a cow's milk. The witch could also use bits of the eggshell to poke people and sicken them. The eggshell had to be ground up very finely (and fed to chickens to make them good egg layers) or broken into pieces and tossed into a running stream.

The cloth used to dry pysanky was powerful, too, and could be used to cure skin diseases. It was considered very bad luck to trample on a pysanka—God would punish anyone who did with a variety of illnesses.

There were superstitions regarding the colors and designs on Ukrainian pysanky. One old Ukrainian myth centered on the wisdom of giving older people gifts of pysanky with darker colors and/or rich designs, for their life has already been filled. Similarly, it is appropriate to give young people pysanky with white as the predominant color because their life is still a blank page. Girls would often give pysanky to young men they fancied, that included heart motifs. It was said, though, that a girl should never give her boyfriend a pysanka that has no design on the top and bottom of the egg, as this might signify that the boyfriend would soon lose his hair.

== Writing Ukrainian pysanky ==
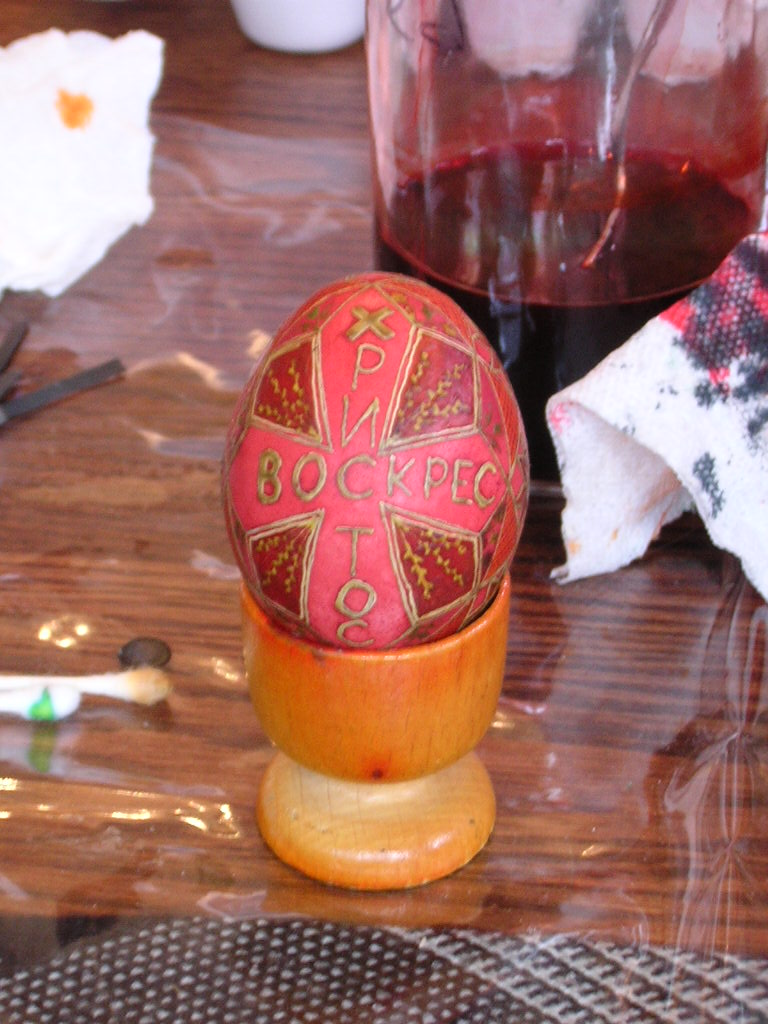
An unfinished pysanka ready for the black bath of dye. It bears the Ukrainian Easter greeting: "Christ is risen!"

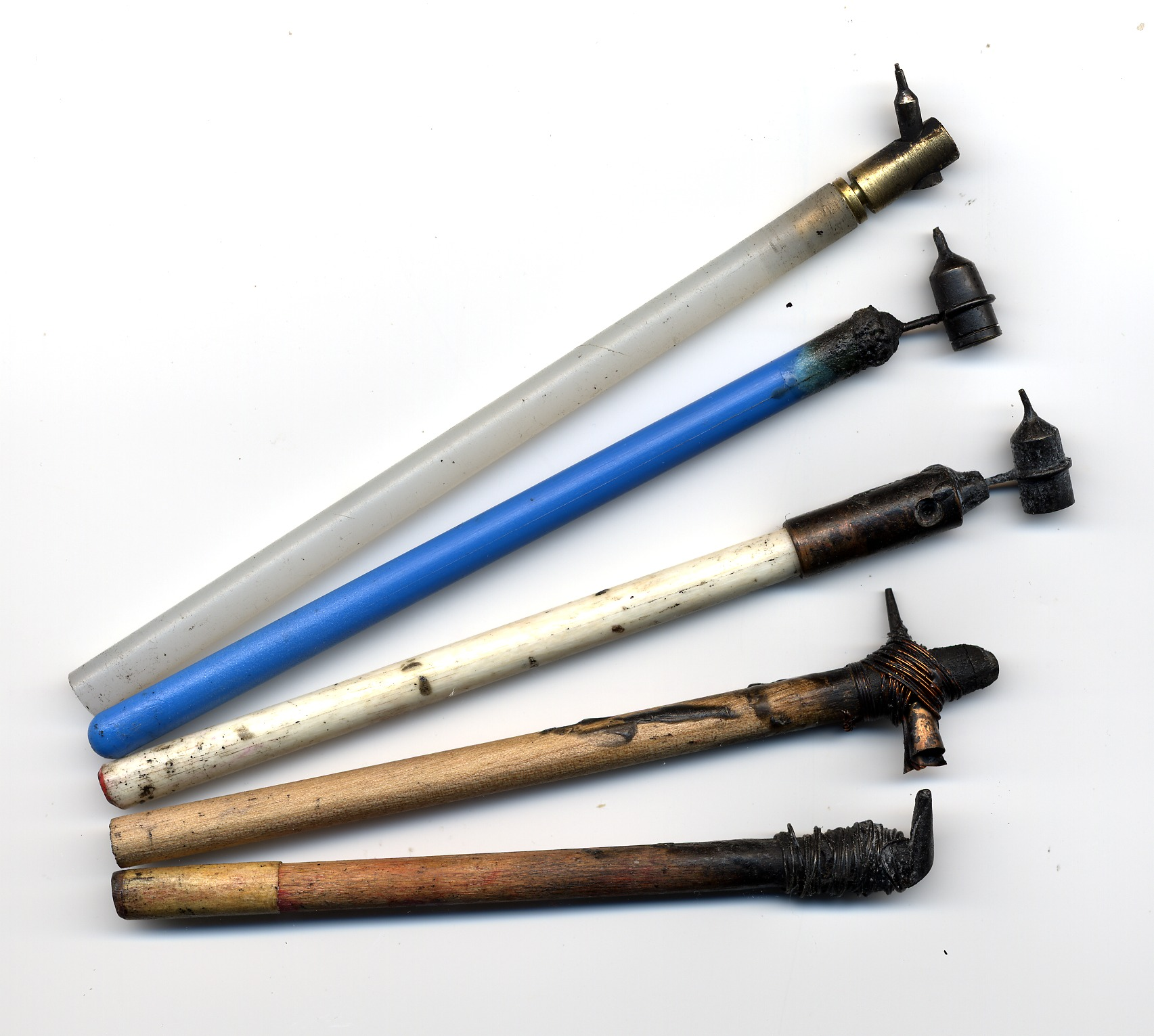
A variety of styluses, from traditional to modern

In Ukraine, each region, each village, and almost every family had its own special ritual; its own symbols, meanings, and secret formulas for dyeing eggs. These customs were preserved faithfully and passed down from mother to daughter through generations. The custom of decorating pysanky was observed with the greatest care, and a pysanka, after receiving the Easter blessing, was held to have great powers as a talisman.

In Ukraine, pysanky were traditionally written during the last week of Lent, Holy Week in the Orthodox and Greek (Uniate) Catholic calendars (both faiths are represented in Ukraine, and both still celebrate Easter by the Julian calendar). They were made by the women of the family. During the middle of the Lenten season, women began putting aside eggs, those that were most perfectly shaped and smooth; ideally, the first laid eggs of young hens. There had to be a rooster, as only fertilized eggs could be used (if non-fertile eggs were used, there would be no fertility in the home).

The dyes were prepared from dried plants, roots, bark, berries and insects (cochineal). Yellow was obtained from the flowers of the woadwaxen, and gold from onion skins. Red could be extracted from logwood or cochineal, and dark green and violet from the husks of sunflower seeds and the berries and bark of the elderberry bush. Black dye was made from walnut husks. The dyes were prepared in secret, using recipes handed down from mother to daughter. Sometimes chemical dyes (of unusual or difficult colors) were purchased from peddlers, along with alum—a mordant which helped the natural dyes adhere better to eggshells.

A stylus, known in Ukrainian as a pysachok, pysak, pysal'tse, or kystka (kistka), depending on region, was prepared. A piece of thin brass was wrapped around a needle, forming a hollow cone. This was attached to a small stick (willow was preferred) with wire or horsehair. In the Lemko regions, a simple pin or nail inserted onto the end of a stick was used instead (drop-pull technique).

The pysanky were made at night, when the children were asleep. The women in the family gathered together, said the appropriate prayers, and went to work. It was done in secret—the patterns and color combinations were handed down from mother to daughter and carefully guarded.

Pysanky were made using a wax-resist (batik) method. Beeswax was heated in a small bowl on the large family stove (піч), and the styluses were dipped into it. The molten wax was applied to the white egg with a writing motion; any bit of shell covered with wax would be sealed, and remain white. Then the egg was dyed yellow, and more wax applied, and then orange, red, purple, black (the dye sequence was always light to dark). Bits of shell covered with wax remained that color. After the final color, usually red, brown or black, the wax was removed by heating the egg in the stove and gently wiping off the melted wax, or by briefly dipping the egg into boiling water.

Boiled eggs were not used, as pysanky were generally written on raw or, less commonly, baked eggs (pecharky). Boiled eggs were dyed red for Easter, using an onion skin dye, and called "krashanky". The number of colors on an egg was usually limited, as natural dyes had very long dyeing times, sometimes hours. Pysanky would be written—and dyed—in batches.

Alternatively, in the ethnic Lemko and Boiko areas of Ukraine, as well as Nadsiannia, the drop pull method was also utilized. A pinhead was dipped into molten wax and then applied to the shell of the egg. Simple drops were made, or there was an additional pulling motion, which would create teardrop or comma shapes. These drops were used to create patterns and designs. Dyeing and wax removal proceeded as with traditional pysanky.

Pysanky continue to be written in Ukraine and in the Ukrainian diaspora in modern times; while many traditional aspects have been preserved, new technologies are in evidence. Aniline dyes have largely replaced natural dyes. Styluses are now made with modern materials. Traditional styluses are still made from brass and wood, but those made with more modern plastic handles are gaining in popularity. An electric version of the stylus has been commercially available since the 1970s, with the cone becoming a metal reservoir which keeps the melted beeswax at a constant temperature and holds a much larger amount than a traditional stylus. These newer styluses (whether electric or not) also sport machined heads, with sizes or the opening ranging from extra-extra-fine to extra-heavy.

== Sharing Ukrainian pysanky ==
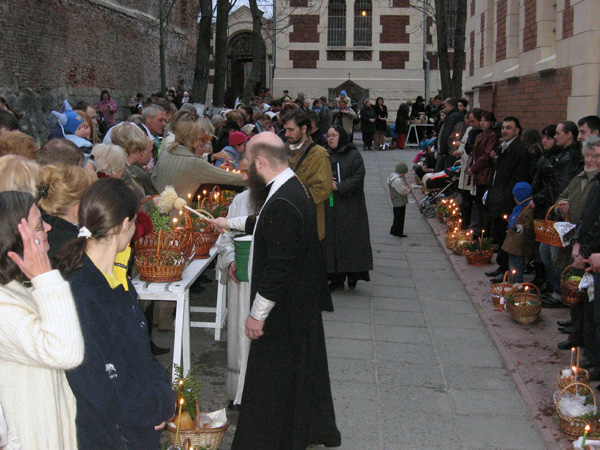
Ukrainian Eastern Orthodox priest blessing Easter baskets in Lviv, Ukraine

In Ukraine, pysanky are typically made to be given to family members and respected outsiders. To give a pysanka is to give a symbolic gift of life, which is why the egg must remain whole. Furthermore, the design, a combination of the motifs and colors on a traditional folk pysanka, has a deep, symbolic meaning. Traditionally, a pysanka given with its symbolic meaning in mind, be it wishes of protection, fecundity, or love. Typically, pysanky were displayed prominently in a public room of the house.

In a large family, by Holy Thursday, 60 or more eggs would have been completed by the women of the house (the more daughters a family had, the more pysanky would be produced). The eggs would then be taken to the church on Easter Sunday to be blessed, after which they were given away. Here is a partial list of how the pysanky would be used:

1. One or two would be given to the priest.
2. Three or four were taken to the cemetery and placed on graves of the family.
3. Ten or twenty were given to children or godchildren.
4. Ten or twelve were exchanged by the unmarried girls with the eligible men in the community.
5. Several were saved to place in the coffin of loved ones who might die during the year.
6. Several were saved to keep in the home for protection from fire, lightning and storms.
7. Two or three were placed in the mangers of cows and horses to ensure safe calving and colting and a good milk supply for the young.
8. At least one egg was placed beneath the bee hive to ensure good production of honey.
9. One was saved for each grazing animal to be taken out to the fields with the shepherds in the spring.
10. Several pysanky were placed in the nests of hens to encourage the laying of eggs.
11. A few would be placed in the orchard and in the fields to promote a good harvest.

Everyone from the youngest to the oldest received a pysanka for Easter. Young people were given pysanky with bright designs; dark pysanky were given to older people.

A bowl full of pysanky was invariably kept in every Ukrainian home. It was kept in the pokut (покуть), the corner opposite the pich (stove), with the family icons. It served not only as a colorful display, but also as protection from all dangers. In Hutsulshchyna, some of the eggs were emptied, and a bird's head made of wax or dough and wings and tail-feathers of folded paper were attached. These "doves" were suspended before the icons in commemoration of the birth of Christ, when a dove came down from heaven and soared over the child Jesus.

== Traditional symbols on Ukrainian folk pysanky ==
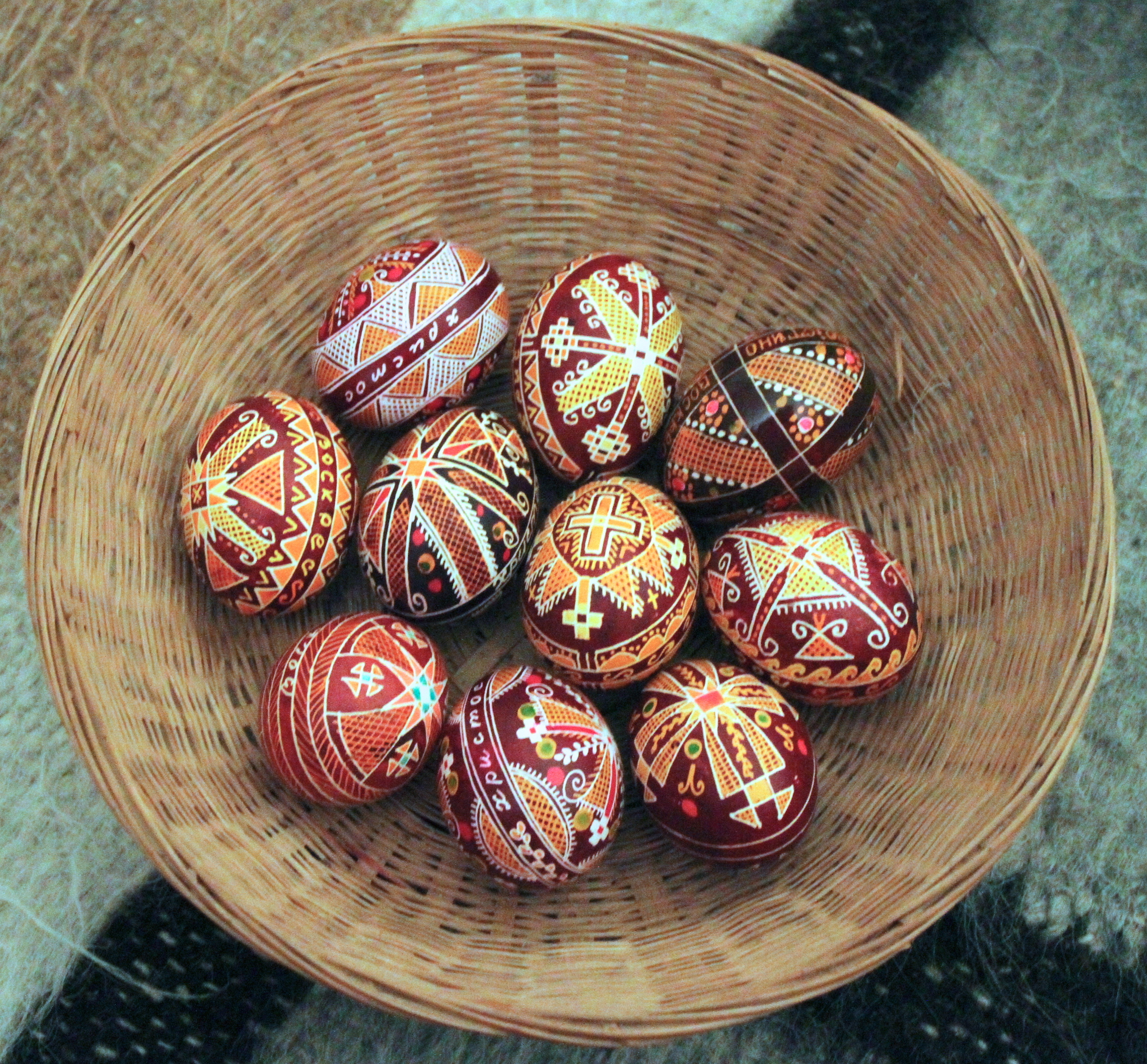
A basket full of Ukrainian Hutsul pysanky

A great variety of ornamental motifs are found on Ukrainian pysanky. Because of the egg's fragility, few ancient examples of pysanky have survived. However, similar design motifs occur in Ukrainian pottery, woodwork, metalwork, Ukrainian embroidery and other folk arts, many of which have survived.

The symbols which decorated Ukrainian pysanky underwent a process of adaptation over time. In pre-Christian times these symbols imbued an egg with magical powers to ward off evil spirits, banish winter, guarantee a good harvest and bring a person good luck. After 988AD, when Christianity became the state religion of Ukraine, the interpretation of many of the symbols began to change, and the pagan motifs were reinterpreted in a Christian light.

Since the mid-19th century, pysanky in Ukraine have been written more for decorative reasons than for the purposes of magic; especially among the Ukrainian diaspora, as belief in most such rituals and practices has dropped off in a more modern, scientific era. Additionally, the Ukrainian diaspora has reinterpreted meanings and created their own new symbols and interpretations of older ones.

The names and meaning of various symbols and design elements vary from region to region of Ukraine, and even from village to village. Similar symbols can have totally different interpretations in different places. There are several thousand different motifs in Ukrainian folk designs. They can be grouped into several families. Keep in mind that these talismanic meanings applied to traditional Ukrainian folk pysanky with traditional designs, not to modern original creations.

=== Geometric ===
Sorokoklyn from Ukrainian Polissia

The most popular Ukrainian pysanka motifs are geometric figures. The egg is most often divided by straight lines into squares, triangles and other shapes. These shapes are then filled with other forms and designs. These are also among the most ancient symbols, with the решето (resheto; sieve) motif dating back to Paleolithic times. Other ancient geometric symbols are agricultural in nature: triangles, which symbolized clouds or rain; quadrilaterals, especially those with a resheto design in them, symbolized a ploughed field; dots stood for seeds.

Geometric symbols used quite commonly on Ukrainian pysanky today. The triangle is said to symbolize the Holy Trinity. In ancient times, it symbolized other trinities: the elements of air, fire and water, the family (man, woman and child), or the cycle of life (birth, life, and death). Diamonds, a type of quadrilateral, are sometimes said to symbolize knowledge.

Curls/spirals are symbols of the ancient water god Zmiya/Serpent and are said to have a meaning of defense or protection. The spiral is said to be protective against the нечиста сила, an evil spirit which, if they happen to enter such a protected home, will be drawn into the spiral and trapped there.

Dots, which can represent seeds, stars, or cuckoo birds' eggs (a symbol of spring), are popularly said to be the tears of the blessed Virgin. Hearts are also sometimes seen, and, as in other cultures, represent love.

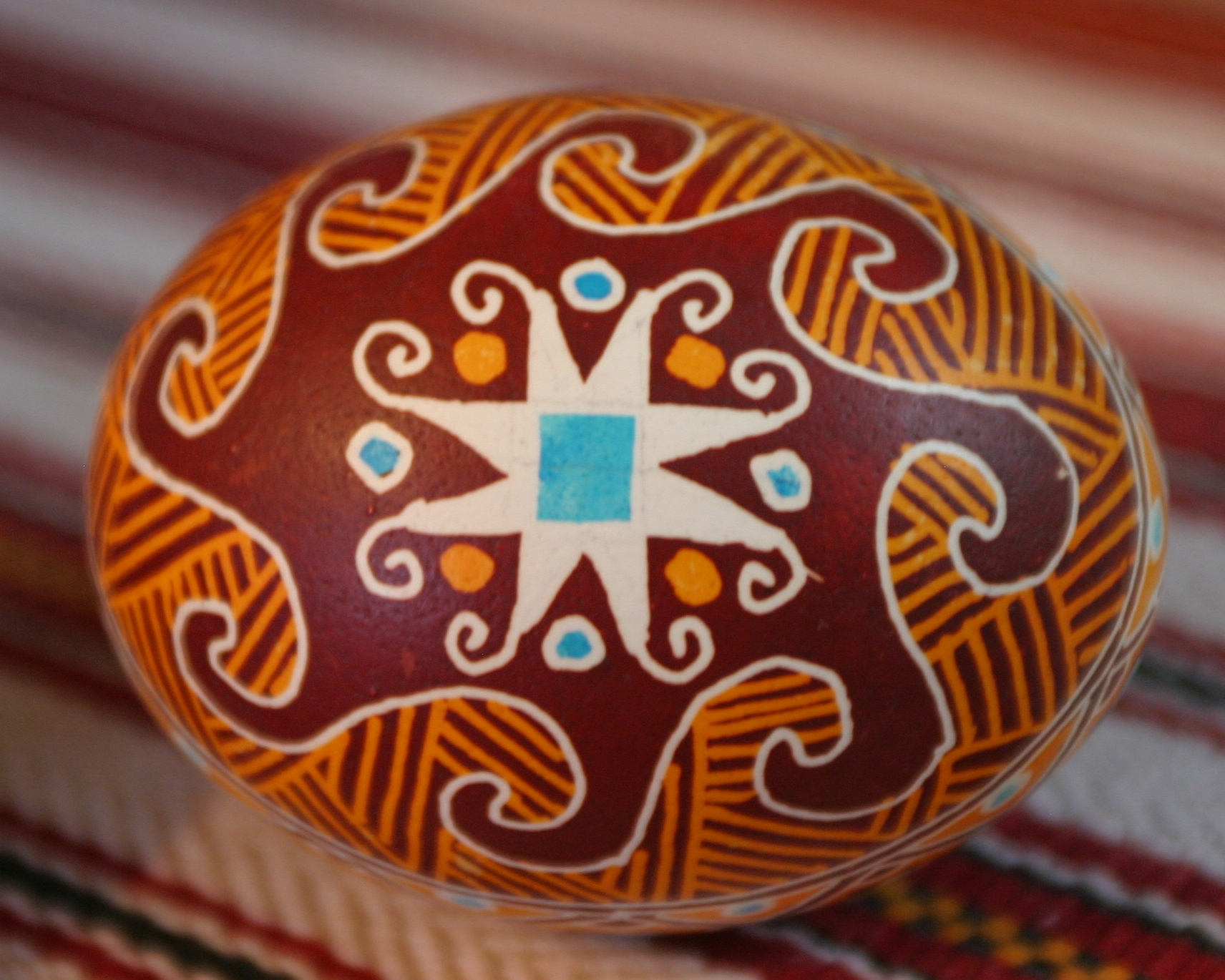
A meander motif on a traditional Ukrainian pysanka

An adaptation on geometric design is not a symbol per se. A division of the egg called "forty triangles" (actually 48) or "Sorokoklyn" (forty wedges) does not have any known ancient meaning. It is often said to represent the forty days of lent, the forty martyrs, the forty days that Christ spent in the desert, or the forty life tasks of married couples.

==== Eternity bands ====
Eternity bands or meanders are composed of waves, lines, or ribbons; such a line is called in Ukrainian a "bezkonechnyk." A line without end is said to represent immortality. Waves, however, are a water symbol, and thus a symbol of the Zmiya/Serpent—the ancient water god. Waves are therefore considered an agricultural symbol, because it is rain that ensures good crops.

=== Berehynia ===
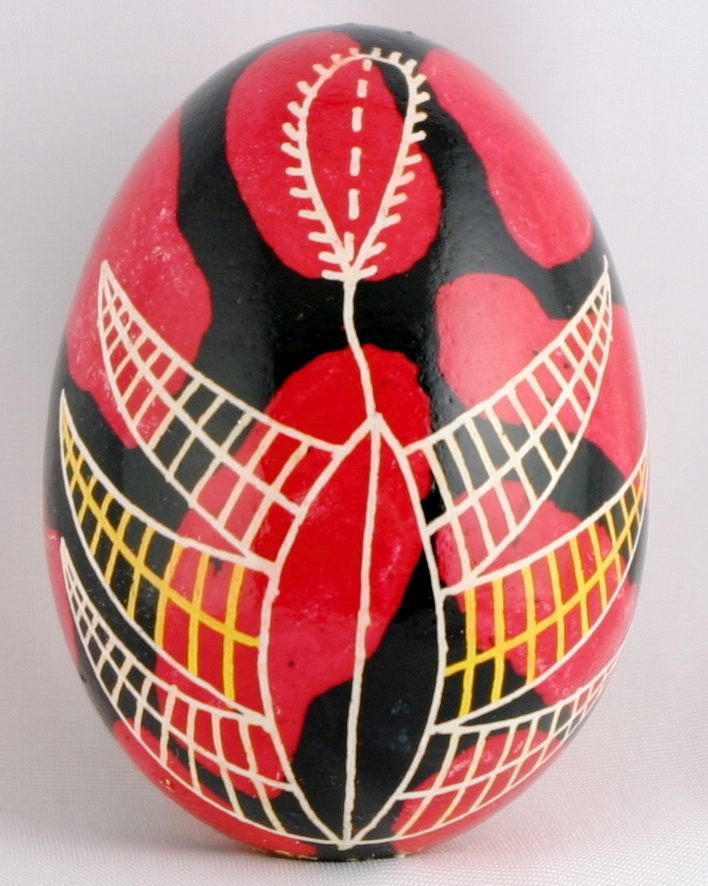
A traditional Ukrainian pysanka with a berehynia motif

The goddess motif is an ancient one, and most commonly found in Ukrainian pysanky from Bukovina, Polesia or Podillia. In Ukrainian tradition, the Berehynia was believed to be the source of life and death. On the one hand, she is a life giving mother, the creator of heaven and all living things, and the mistress of heavenly water (rain), upon which the world relies for fertility and fruitfulness. On the other hand, she was the merciless controller of destinies.

The goddess is sometimes depicted with arms upraised, and the arms vary in number but are always in pairs: 2, 4 or 6. This is similar to the appearance of the Christian Oranta. Pysanky with this motif were called "bohyn'ky" (богиньки, little goddesses) or "zhuchky" (жучки, beetles), the latter because they are similar in appearance to the Cyrillic letter Ж (zh). Sometimes the Berehynia has become abstracted, and is represented by a plant—vazon—the tree of life. Her arms become the branches and flowers, and she is firmly rooted in a flowerpot.

The most common depiction of the great goddess is a composition containing "kucheri" (curls). The Berehynia may be seen perched on a curl, or a curl may be given wings; the symbol may be doubled, end-to-end. There is usually a crown on the Berehynia's head. These compositions are given the folk names of "queen," "princess," "rooster," "scythe," "drake," or simply "wings."

=== Christian symbols ===
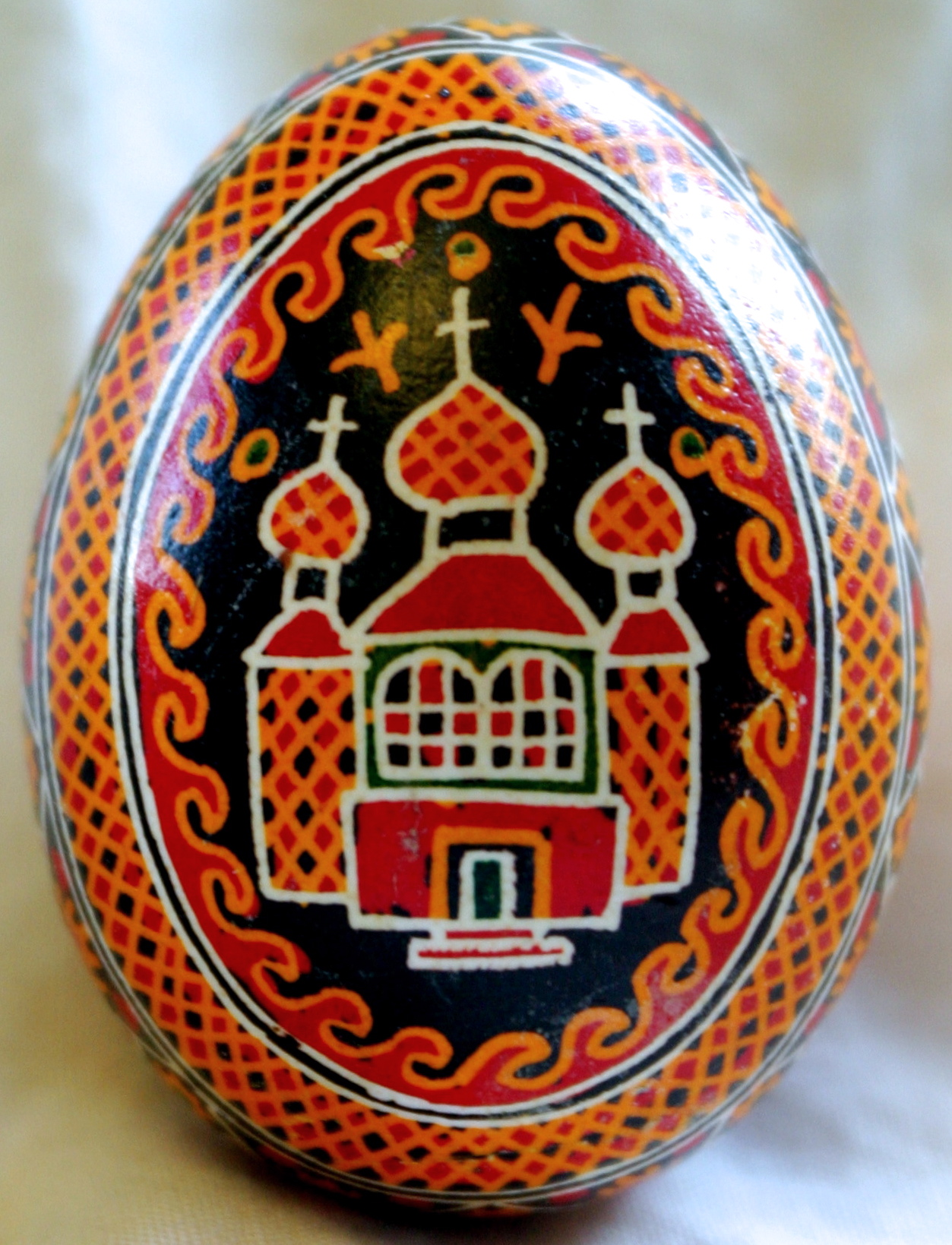
A traditional Ukrainian pysanka with a church motif

The only potential Christian symbol found on Ukrainian folk pysanky, and one probably not adapted from an earlier pagan one, is the church. Stylized churches are often found on pysanky from Hutsul regions (including parts of Bukovina). Church parts are usually in threes: three stories/roofs, three towers, three openings (windows, doors). Sometimes only the bell tower (dzvinytsia) is depicted.

Crosses are a common Ukrainian motif, although most of those found on folk pysanky are not Ukrainian (Byzantine) crosses. The crosses most commonly depicted are of the simple "Greek" cross type, with arms of equal lengths. This type of cross predates Christianity, and is a sun symbol (an abstracted representation of the solar bird); it is sometimes combined with the star (ruzha) motif. The "cross crosslet" type of cross, one in which the ends of each arm are crossed, is frequently seen, particularly on Hutsul and Bukovinian pysanky.

Other adapted religious symbols include a triangle with a circle in the center, denoting the eye of God, and one known as the "hand of god."

In the 20th and 21st centuries, the commercially produced folk pysanky of the Ukrainian Carpathians, especially Kosmach, have begun displaying more Christian symbols. The lower arm of the cross in older designs is often lengthened to appear more Christian, even if it throws off the symmetry of the design. Crucifixes are sometimes seen. Pysanky are being written with depictions of Easter baskets on them, including a paska and candle. White doves, symbols of the Holy Spirit, are also more frequently seen; doves are usually depicted in flight, while other wild birds are traditionally shown perched.

=== Phytomorphic (plant) motifs ===
Floral ornaments from the Ukrainian Lemko Region

The most common motifs found on Ukrainian pysanky are those associated with plants and their parts (flowers and fruit). Ukrainian women who wrote pysanky drew their inspiration from the world of nature, depicting flowers, trees, fruits, leaves and whole plants in a highly stylized (not realistic) fashion. Such ornaments symbolized the rebirth of nature after winter, and pysanky were written with plant motifs to guarantee a good harvest. A most popular floral design is a plant in a vase of standing on its own, which symbolized the tree of life and was a highly abstracted version of the berehynia (great goddess).

Pysanky created by the highland mountain people of the Hutsul region of Ukraine often showed a stylized fir tree branch, a symbol of youth and eternal life. Trees, in general, symbolized strength, renewal, creation, growth; as with animal motifs, the parts (leaves, branches) had the same symbolic meaning as the whole. The oak tree was a sacred to the ancient god Perun, the most powerful of the pagan Slavic pantheon, and thus oak leaves symbolized strength.

Pussy willow branches are sometimes depicted on pysanky; in Ukraine, the pussy willow replaces the palm leaf on Palm Sunday. This is not a common motif, though, and may be a more recent addition.

Two very popular plant motifs on modern Ukrainian diasporan pysanky are poppies and wheat; these motifs are not seen on traditional pysanky, and are considered a modern innovation.

==== Flowers ====
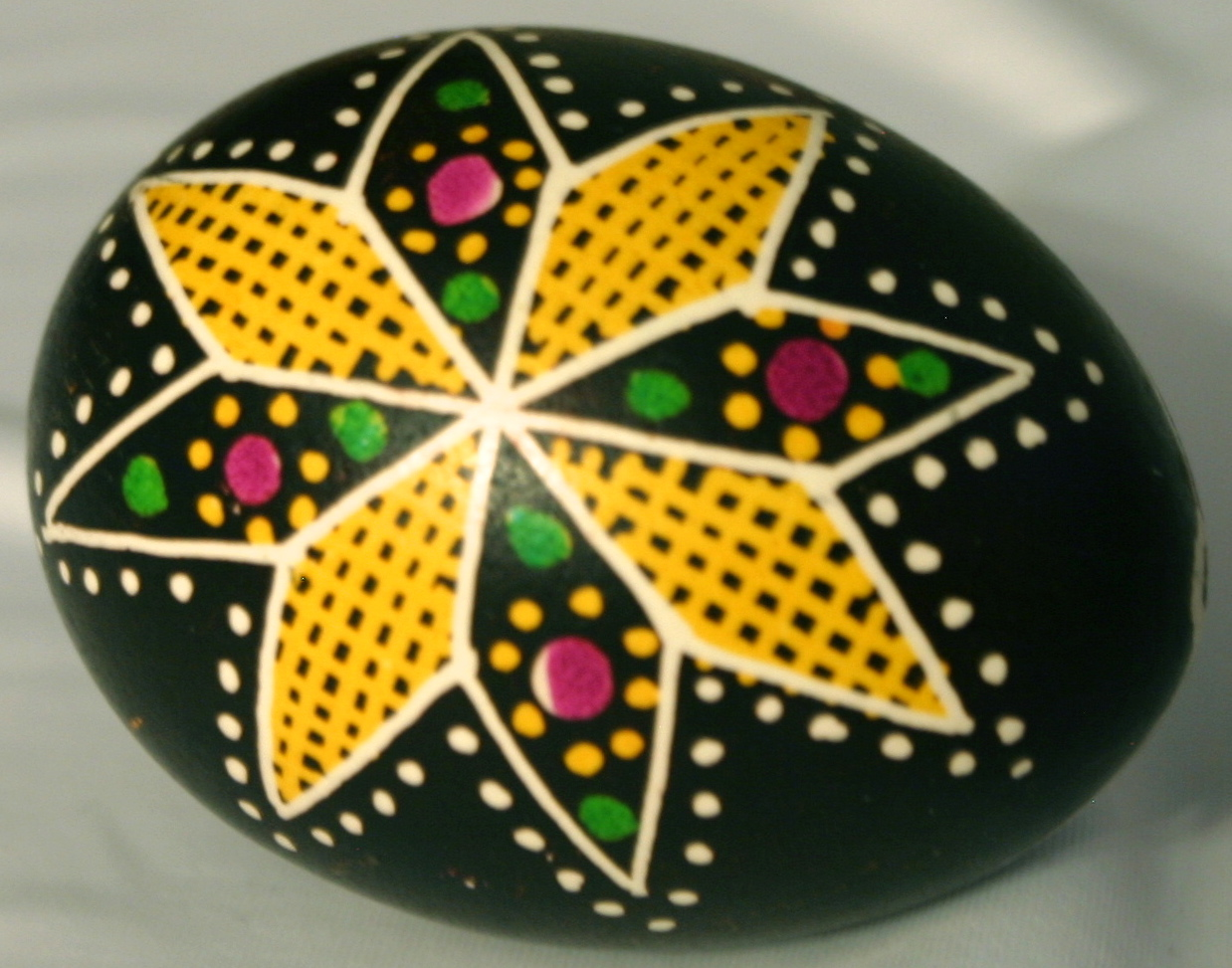
A Ukrainian pysanka with a ruzha (eight pointed star) motif

Flowers are a common Ukrainian pysanka motif. They can be divided into two types: specific botanical types, and non-specific.

Specific botanical types include sunflowers, daisies, violets, carnations, periwinkle and lily-of the-valley. These flowers are represented with identifying features that make them recognizable. Carnations will have a serrated edge to the petals, the flowers of the lily of the valley will be arrayed along a stem, periwinkle will have three or four leaves (periwinkle is represented by its leaves, not its flowers, on pysanky).

There are also flower motifs called orchids and tulips, but these are not botanical names. They are actually the names given to fantastical flowers, as neither of these flowers was commonly found in Ukraine until modern times. The names reflected the exoticism of the designs.

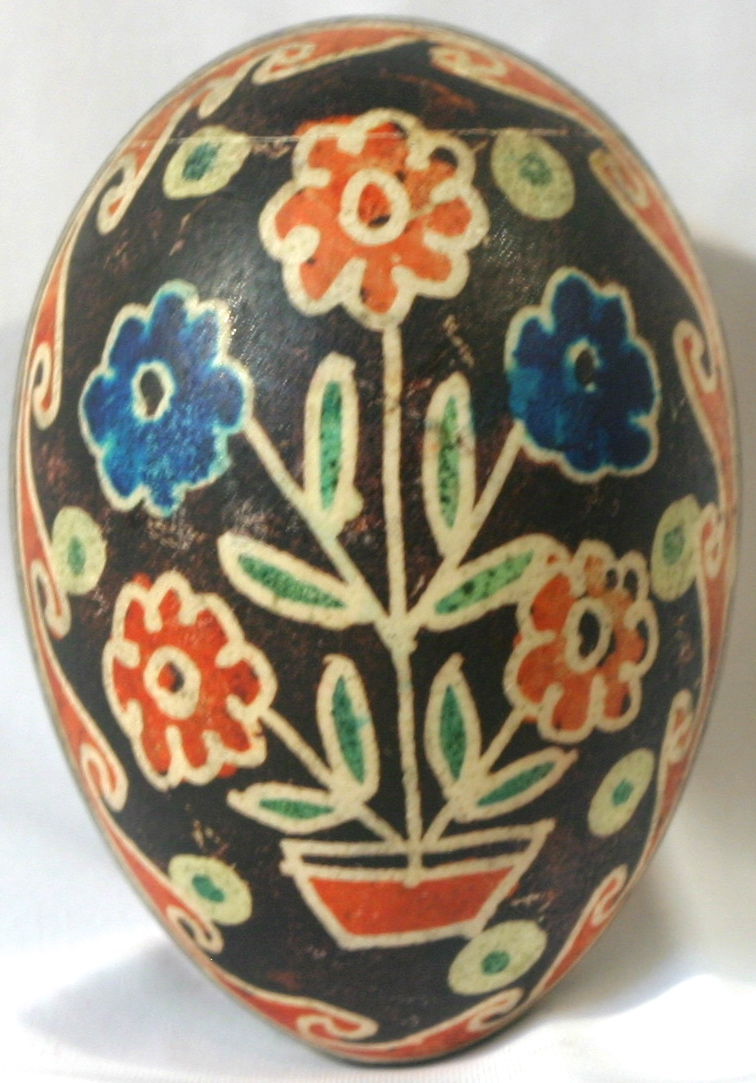
Traditional Ukrainian pysanka from Bukovina region, with a vazon motif

Non-specific flowers are much more common, and consist of the ruzha and others. The ruzha (or rozha) is named after the mallow flower, although it does not resemble one, and is another name given to the eight-pointed star motif. A ruzha can be full, empty, compound, divided or even crooked. It is a sun sign. Other non-specific types often have hyphenated names: potato-flower, strawberry-flower, etc. They are usually simple arrangements of petals, six or more, and bear little resemblance to the plant they are named for.

==== Vazon/Tree of Life ====
The "tree of life" motif is widely used in Ukrainian folk pysanky designs. It can be represented in many ways. Sometimes it appears as two deer on either side of a pine tree. More often it manifests as a flower pot ("vazon"), filled with leaves and flowers. The pot itself is usually a rectangle, triangle or a rhomboid (symbolic of the earth), and is covered with dots (seeds) and dashes (water). Many branches grow out of it, in a symmetric fashion, with leaves and flowers. This plant is a berehynia (goddess) symbol, with the branches representing the many arms of the mother goddess.

==== Fruit ====
Fruit is not a common motif on Ukrainian pysanky.. Apples, plums and cherries are depicted on traditional folk pysanky, although without much botanical detail. Currants and viburnum (kalyna) berries are sometimes seen, too. These motifs are probably related to fecundity. Grapes are seen more often, as they have been transformed from an agricultural motif to a religious one, representing the Holy Communion.

=== Scevomorphic motifs ===
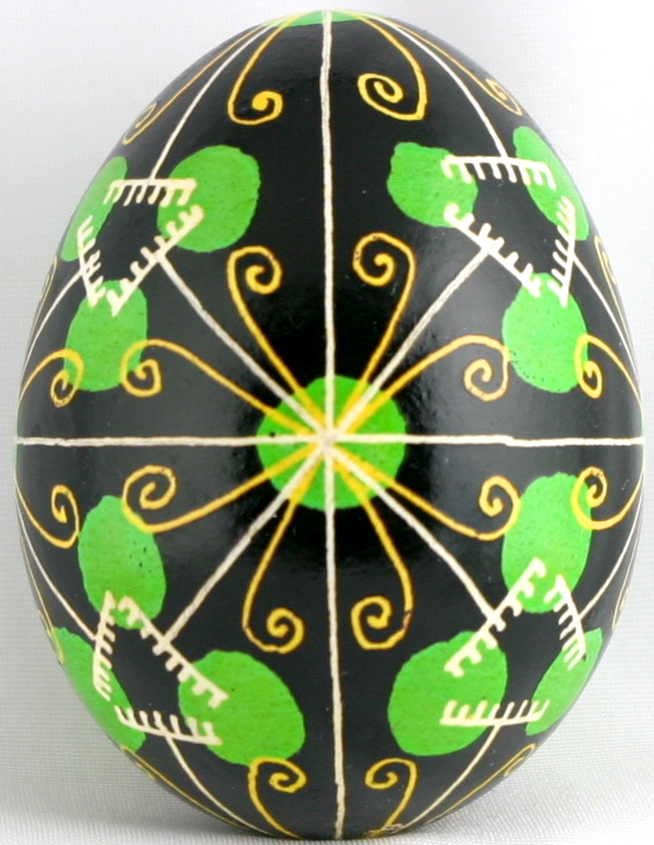
A traditional Ukrainian pysanka with rake motifs

Skevomorphic designs are the second-largest group of Ukrainian folk motifs, and are representations of man-made agricultural objects. These symbols are very common, as Ukraine was a highly agricultural society, and drew many of its positive images from field and farm. Some of these symbols are related to agriculture; others have older meanings, but were renamed in more recent times based on their appearance.

Common symbols include the ladder, symbolizing prayers going up to heaven, and the sieve (resheto), standing for a plowed field, or perhaps the separation of good and evil. Rakes and combs are often depicted; both are meant to invoke a good harvest, as both are rain symbols. The body of the rake (sometimes depicted as a triangle) is the cloud, and the teeth symbolize rain drops. (Note: these combs are not hair combs, but agricultural implements, see Harrow (tool).)

Windmills, a variation on the broken cross (swastika) motif, are sun symbols. The movement of the cross echoes the movement of the sun across the sky.

=== Zoomorphic (animal) motifs ===
Wolf's teeth Ukrainian pysanka from Odesa

Although animal motifs are not as popular as plant motifs on Ukrainian pysanky, they are nevertheless encountered, especially those of the Ukrainians of the Carpathian Mountains. Animals depicted on pysanky include both wild animals (deer, birds, fish) and domesticated ones (rams, horses, poultry). As with plants, animals were depicted in the abstract, highly stylized, and not with realistic details.

Horses were popular motifs because they symbolized strength and endurance, as well as wealth and prosperity. They also had a second meaning as a sun symbol: in some versions of Ukrainian pagan mythology, the sun was drawn across the sky by the steeds of Dazhboh, the sun god. Similarly, deer motifs were fairly common as they were intended to bring prosperity and long life; in other versions of the myth, it was the stag who carried the sun across the sky on his antlers. Rams are symbols of leadership, strength, dignity, and perseverance.

Sometimes Ukrainian women simply drew parts of animals; these symbols were a sort of shorthand, endowed with all the attributes of the animal represented. Ducks' necks, goose feet, rabbits' ears, rams' horns, wolves' teeth, bear claws, and bulls' eyes can all be found on Ukrainian pysanky. One cannot be sure, however, if these symbols were actually meant to represent animals, or were renamed centuries later because of their appearance.

==== Birds ====
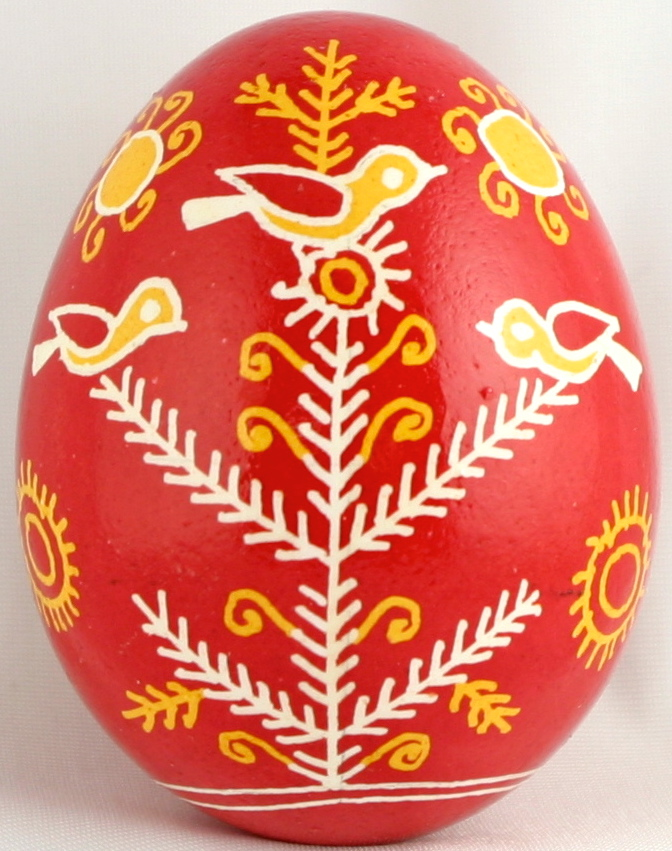
A traditional Ukrainian pysanka with bird motifs

Birds were considered the harbingers of spring, thus they were a commonplace Ukrainian pysanka motif. Birds of all kinds are the messengers of the sun and heaven. They are always shown perched, at rest, never flying (except for swallows and, in more recent times, white doves carrying letters). Roosters are symbols of masculinity, or the coming of dawn, and hens represent fertility.

Birds were almost always shown in full profile, stylized, but with characteristic features of the species. Partial representations of some birds––mostly domestic fowl––are often seen on pysanky. Bird parts (eyes, feet, beaks, combs, feathers) are said carry the same meaning as the entire bird. Thus hen's feet represent fertility and the rooster's comb signifies masculinity.

==== Insects ====
Insects are only rarely depicted on Ukrainian pysanky. Highly stylized spiders (and occasionally their webs) are the most common on folk pysanky, and symbolize perseverance. Beetles are sometimes seen, but rarely look anything like a beetle. What they do resemble, somewhat, is the letter Ж, as in their Ukrainian name "жучок." Other insects are sometimes seen on modern, diasporan Ukrainian pysanky, most commonly butterflies and bees, but appear to be a modern innovation. In Onyshchuk's "Symbolism of the Ukrainian Pysanka" she depicts pysanky with a butterfly motif, but the original design, recorded by Kulzhynsky in 1899, was labeled as being swallows' tails.

==== Fish ====
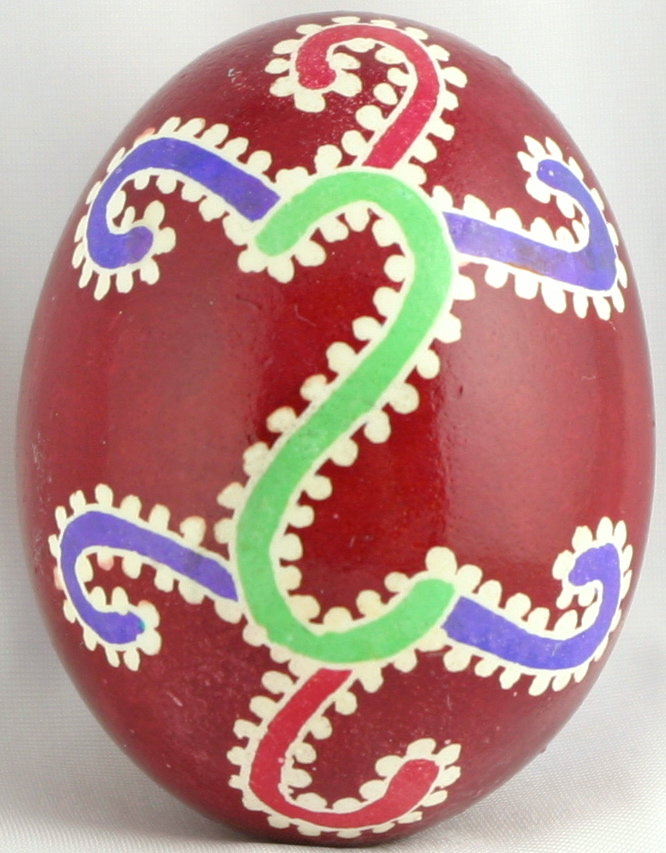
A traditional Ukrainian pysanka with spirals

The fish, originally a Ukrainian symbol of health, eventually came to symbolize Jesus Christ, the "fisher of men." In old Ukrainian fairy tales, the fish often helped the hero to win his fight with evil. In the Greek alphabet "fish" (ichthys) is an acrostic of "Jesus Christ, Son of God, Savior," and it became a secret symbol used by the early Christians. The fish represents abundance, as well as Christian interpretations of baptism, sacrifice, the powers of regeneration, and Christ himself.

==== Serpent ====
Another Ukrainian symbol is that of the змія or serpent, the ancient god of water and earth. The serpent could be depicted in several ways: as an "S" or sigma, as a curl or spiral, or as a wave. When depicted as a sigma, the zmiya often wears a crown. Depictions of the serpent can be found on Neolithic Trypillian pottery. The serpent symbol on a Ukrainian pysanka is said to bring protection from catastrophe. Spirals were particularly strong talismans, as an evil spirit, upon entering the house, would be drawn into the spiral and trapped there.

=== Astronomical motifs ===
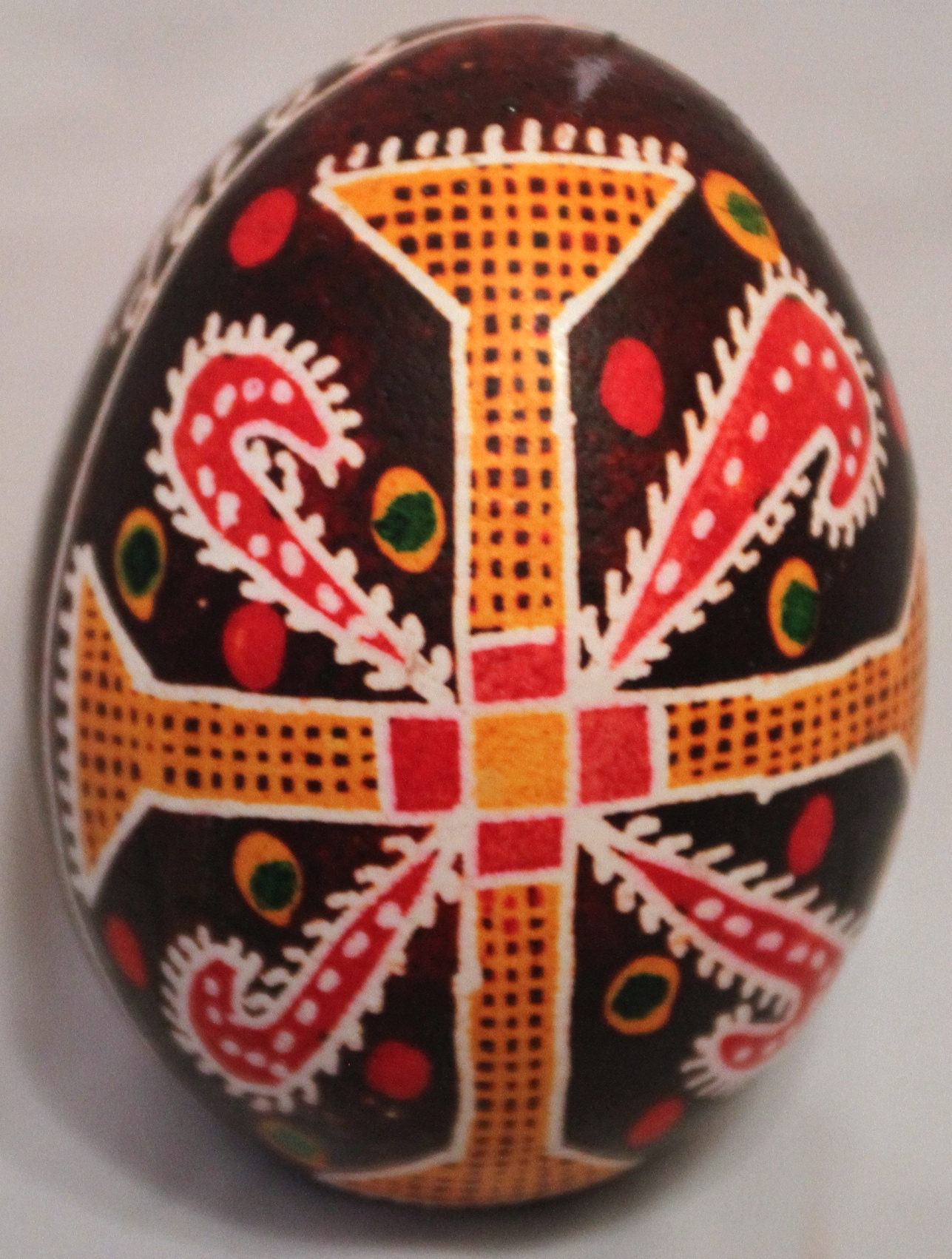
Traditional Ukrainian pysanka with a swastika (svarha) motif

Among the oldest and most important symbols of Ukrainian pysanky is the sun, and the simplest rendering of the sun is a closed circle with or without rays. Pysanky from all regions of Ukraine depict an eight-sided star, the most common depiction of the sun; this symbol is also called a "ruzha." Six- or seven-sided stars can also be seen, but much less commonly.

The sun can also appear as a flower or a трилист (three leaf). The swastika, called in Ukrainian a "svarha," is sometimes referred to as a "broken cross" or "ducks' necks." It represented the sun in pagan times: the movement of the arms around the cross represented the movement of the sun across the sky. The Slavic pagans also believed that the sun did not rise on its own, but was carried across the sky by a stag (or, in some versions, a horse). The deer and horses often found on Hutsul pysanky are solar symbols.

Pysanky with sun motifs were said to have been especially powerful, because they could protect their owner from sickness, bad luck and the evil eye. In Christian times the sun symbol is said to represent life, warmth, and the love and the Christian God.

Other astronomical symbols are less commonly seen. The moon is sometimes depicted as a circle with a cross inside it; it is begged to shed its light at night to help the traveller, and to chase away evil powers from the household. Stars are sometimes represented as dots.

=== Patriotic motifs ===
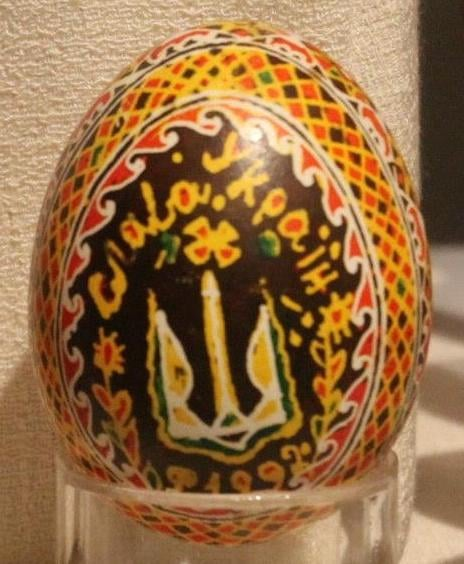
Patriotic Ukrainian symbols and text on a Hutsul pysanka

In times of political upset, Ukrainian pysanky have reflected such changes through the motifs depicted. During periods of national independence movements in the early 20th century, tridents were frequently depicted on pysanky; this can be seen in the work of Iryna Bilianska, whose pysanky are housed in the Ukrainian Museum of New York. The same happened after Ukrainian independence in 1991; tridents and Ukrainian flags were depicted on pysanky, particularly those sold at Ukrainian Hutsul Easter markets.

With the Russia invasion of Ukraine in 2014 and annexation of Crimea and occupation of Donetsk and Luhansk, and continuing through the full-scale Russian invasion in 2022, patriotic motifs are once again being written on pysanky. These include tridents, the a rooster of Vasylkiv majolica, tractors (pulling armored vehicles), and patriotic inscriptions like "Oh in the meadow", "For the freedom of Ukraine", "I believe in Ukrainian Armed Forces", etc. Pysanky dyed with the blue and yellow colors of Ukrainian flag have become more popular, and the tryzub (trident) is often pictured, as well as those written with the shape of Ukraine's borders and the inscription "United Ukraine", the national Ukrainian motto.

== Ukrainian color symbolism ==
It is not only motifs on Ukrainian pysanky which carried symbolic weight:, colors also had significance. Although the earliest Ukrainian pysanky were often simply two-toned, and many folk designs still are, some believed that the more colors there were on a decorated egg, the more magical power it held. A multi-colored egg could thus bring its owner better luck and a better fate.

The color palette of traditional Ukrainian folk pysanky was fairly limited, as it was based on natural dyes. Yellow, red/orange, green, brown and black were the predominant colors. With the advent of aniline dyes in the 1800s, small amounts of blue and purple were sometimes added. The meanings below are generalizations; different regions of Ukraine interpreted colors differently.

- Red - is probably the oldest symbolic color, and has many meanings. It represents life-giving blood, and often appears on pysanky with nocturnal and heavenly symbols. It represents love and joy, and the hope of marriage. It is also associated with the sun.
- Black - is a particularly sacred color, and is most commonly associated with the "other world," but not in a negative sense.
- Yellow - symbolized the moon and stars and also, agriculturally, the harvest.
- Blue - Represented blue skies or the air, and good health.
- White - Signified purity, birth, light, rejoicing, virginity.
- Green - the color of new life in the spring. Green represents the resurrection of nature, and the riches of vegetation.
- Brown - represents the earth.

Some color combinations had specific meanings, too:

- Black and white - mourning, respect for the souls of the dead.
- Black and red - this combination was perceived as "harsh and frightful," and very disturbing. It is common in Podillya, where both serpent motifs and goddess motifs were written with this combination.
- Four or more colors - the family's happiness, prosperity, love, health and achievements.

As with symbols, these talismanic meanings of colors applied to traditional Ukrainian folk pysanky with traditional designs, and not to modern decorative pysanky.

== See also ==
- Easter egg
- Egg tapping
- Fabergé egg
- Pysanka Museum
- Vegreville egg
