= Ostrožno Brdo =

- Village
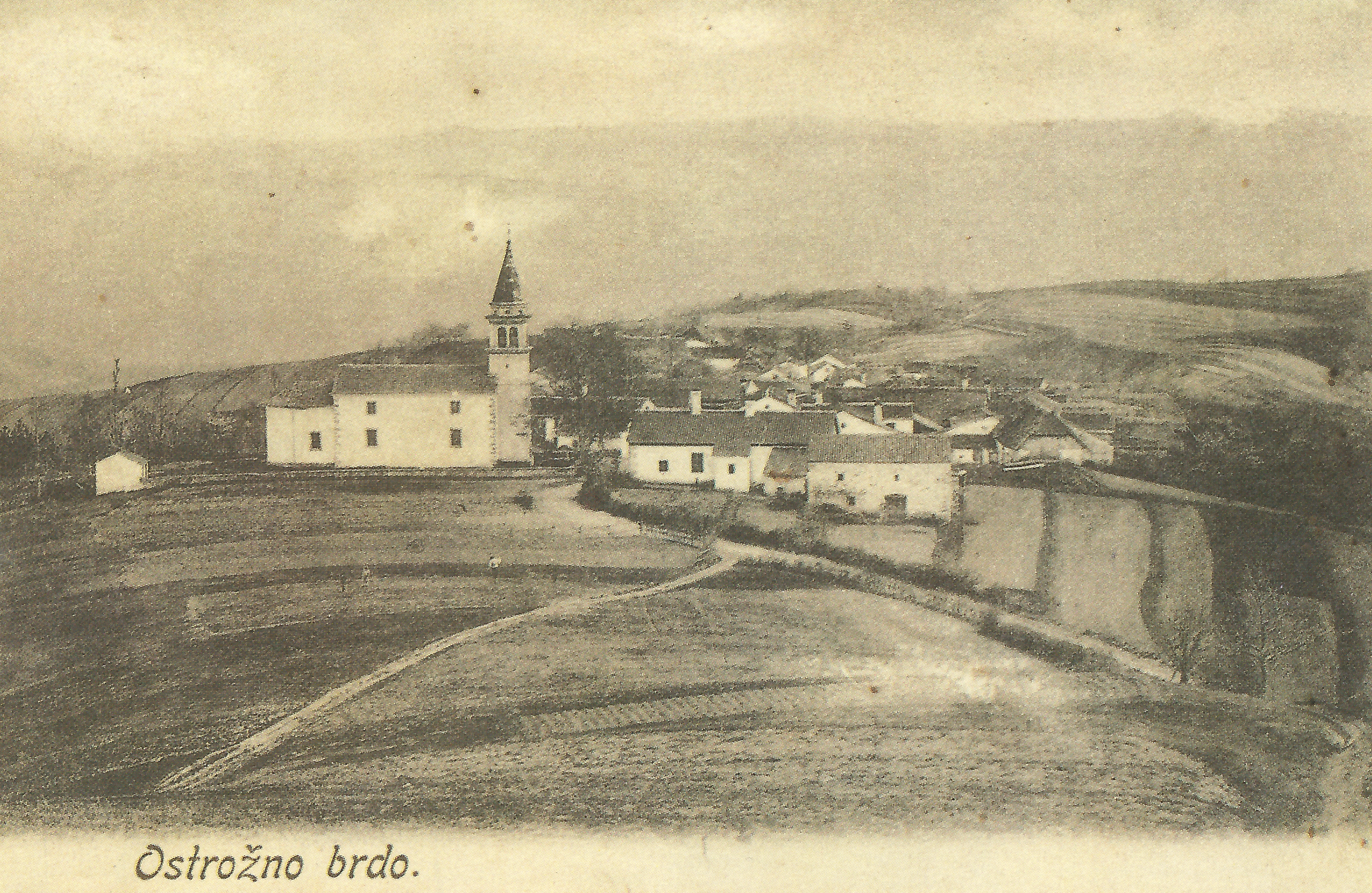
- 1905 postcard of Ostrožno Brdo

- Location in Slovenia
- Coordinates: 45°37′12.96″N 14°7′27.86″E
- Country: Slovenia
- Traditional region: Inner Carniola
- Statistical region: Littoral–Inner Carniola
- Municipality: Ilirska Bistrica

Area
  - Total: 9.32 km^{2} (3.60 sq mi)
- Elevation: 631.9 m (2,073 ft)

Population (2002)
  - Total: 104

Ostrožno Brdo (pronounced [ɔˈstɾoːʒnɔ ˈbəɾdɔ]; German: Ostroschno Berdo, Italian: Monforte del Timavo) is a small village in the hills northwest of Ilirska Bistrica in the Inner Carniola region of Slovenia.

The local church in the settlement is dedicated to Saint Anthony of Padua and belongs to the Parish of Suhorje.

== Notable people ==
- Antonija Volk Krebelj (1908–2003), Slovenian farmer, maker of Suhorje Easter eggs, folk artist, and preserver of folk art
