= Bombing of Borodianka =

War crime during the Russian invasion of Ukraine

Coordinates: 50°38′38″N 29°56′02″E

2022 Borodianka strikes
- Part of the Kyiv offensive during the Russian invasion of Ukraine
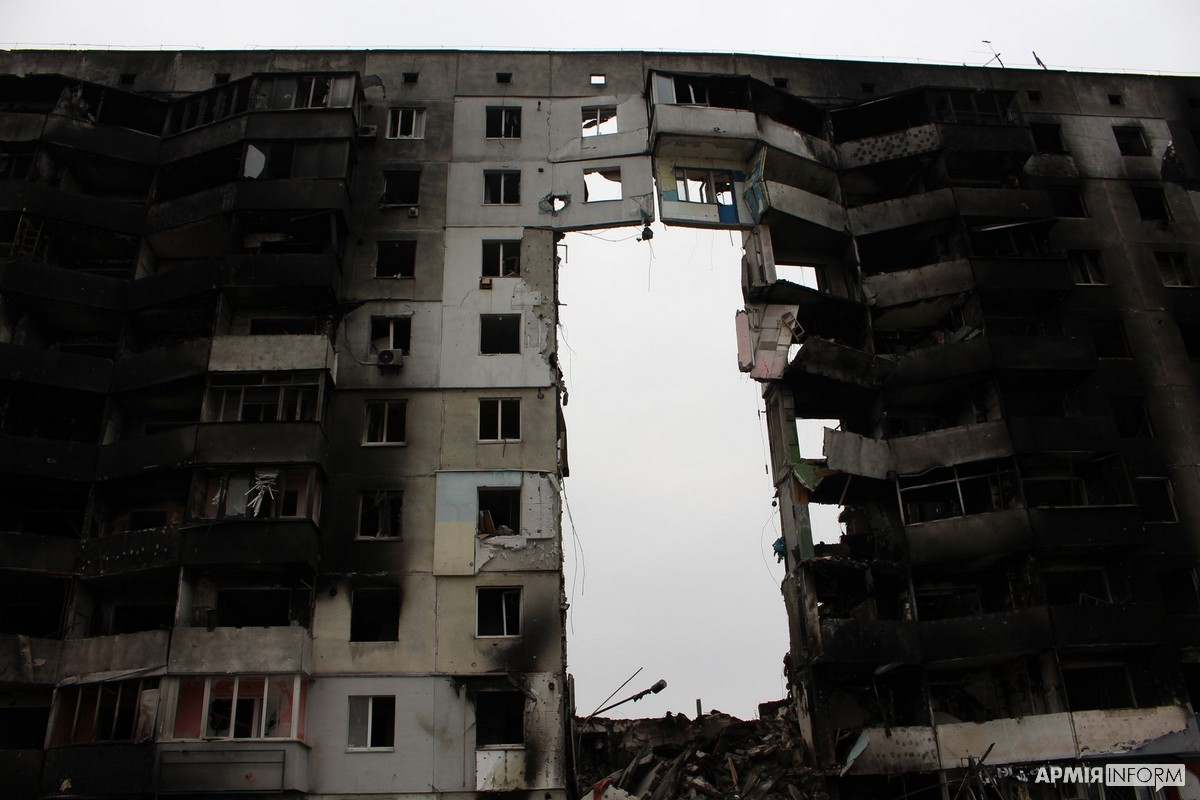
- A building in Borodianka destroyed by Russian bombing
- Location: Borodianka
- Date: 1–2 March 2022; 4 year ago
- Deaths: 40 (Amnesty International) to 80 (Ukrainian government)
- Perpetrator: Russian Armed Forces

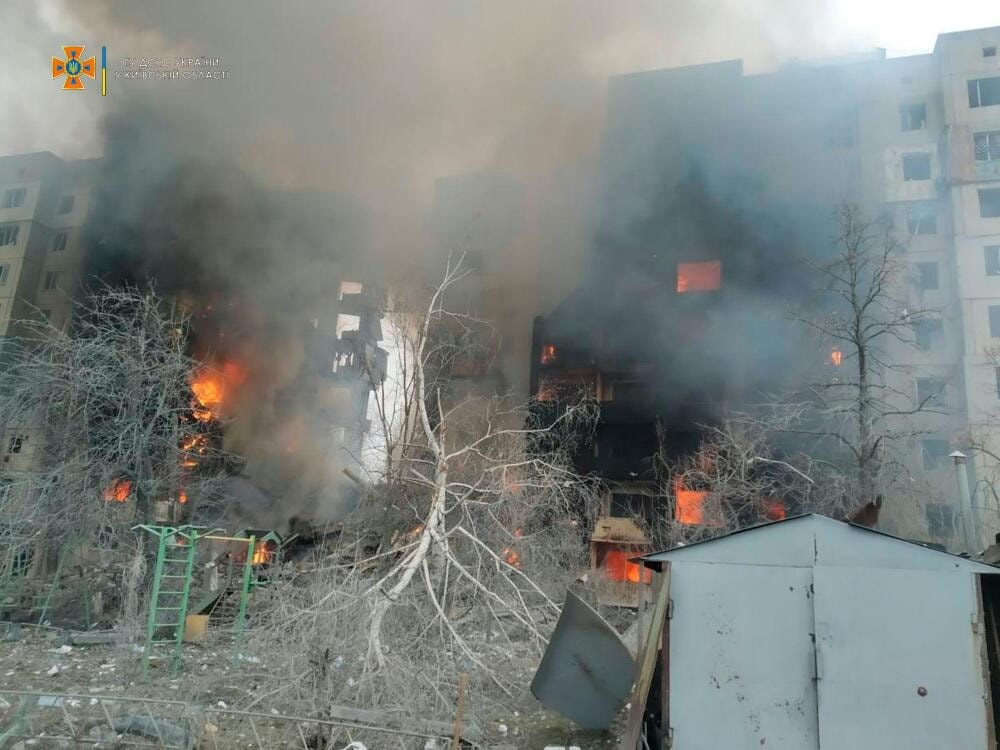
Borodianka after the bombing, 2 March 2022

The town of Borodianka was bombed extensively by the Russian Armed Forces during the Russian invasion of Ukraine.

Volodymyr Zelenskyy reported the town's devastation on 7 April 2022, a week after the Bucha massacre was discovered. 41 bodies had been found under the rubble according to the State Emergency Service of Ukraine. In addition, as of 6 May, local police reports finding of more than 300 bodies in burials made by locals during Russian occupation.

== Russian attacks ==
Before the Russian invasion of Ukraine, Borodianka, a quiet "one-street town" to the north of Kyiv, had roughly 13,000 residents.

As Russian forces fought in and near Kyiv, Borodianka, which is on a strategically important road, was targeted by numerous Russian airstrikes. The deadliest bombing was conducted in the evening of 1 March and the morning of 2 March, when Russian aviation destroyed 8 multi-storey residential buildings, killing at least 40 civilians.

According to Iryna Venediktova, prosecutor general of Ukraine, and Prosecutor office of Kyiv Oblast, Russian army used air-dropped bombs FAB-250 and multiple rocket launchers Smerch and Uragan. Characteristic damages caused by cluster munitions were found in the town. According to Venediktova, Russian soldiers fired "at night, when the maximum number of people would be at home". Most of the buildings in the town were destroyed, including almost all of its main street. Russian bombs struck the centers of buildings and caused them to collapse while the frames remained standing. Oleksiy Reznikov, minister of defense, said many residents were buried alive by airstrikes and lay dying for up to a week. He further said that those who had gone to help them were shot at by Russian soldiers.

Venediktova also accused the Russian soldiers of "murders, tortures, and beatings" of civilians.

Some residents hid in caves for 38 days. On 26 March 2022, Russia, repelled from Kyiv, progressively withdrew from the region to concentrate on Donbas. Borodianka's mayor said that as the Russian convoy had moved through the town, Russian soldiers had fired through every open window. He estimated at least 200 dead.

Only a few hundred residents remained in Borodianka by the time the Russians withdrew, with roughly 90% of residents having fled, and an unknown number dead in the rubble. The retreating Russian troops placed mines throughout the town.

On 2 May 2022, employees of the State Emergency Service rescued a cat from the seventh floor of a destroyed building, which spent about two months there without food or water and became a symbol of the indomitability of the Ukrainian people in the fight against the Russian occupiers.

== Subsequent developments ==
Agence France-Presse arrived in Borodianka on 5 April. The AFP did not see any bodies, but reported widespread destruction, and that some homes "simply no longer existed". The human death toll remained unclear: one resident reported that he knew of at least five civilians killed, but that others were beneath the rubble and that no one had yet attempted to extricate them.

On 7 April, Venediktova announced that an initial 26 bodies had been discovered in the rubble of two destroyed buildings. She stated that Borodianka was "the most destroyed town in the area" and that "only the civilian population was targeted; there are no military sites." President Volodymyr Zelenskyy subsequently said that the death toll at Borodianka was "even worse" than at Bucha.

According to Europe 1, ten days after the Russian army had left, firefighters were still working to recover bodies from the rubble in order to bury them with dignity. Their work was complicated by the risk of other buildings collapsing. More bodies were discovered daily. Local morgues were overwhelmed, and corpses had to be transported 100 kilometres or more.

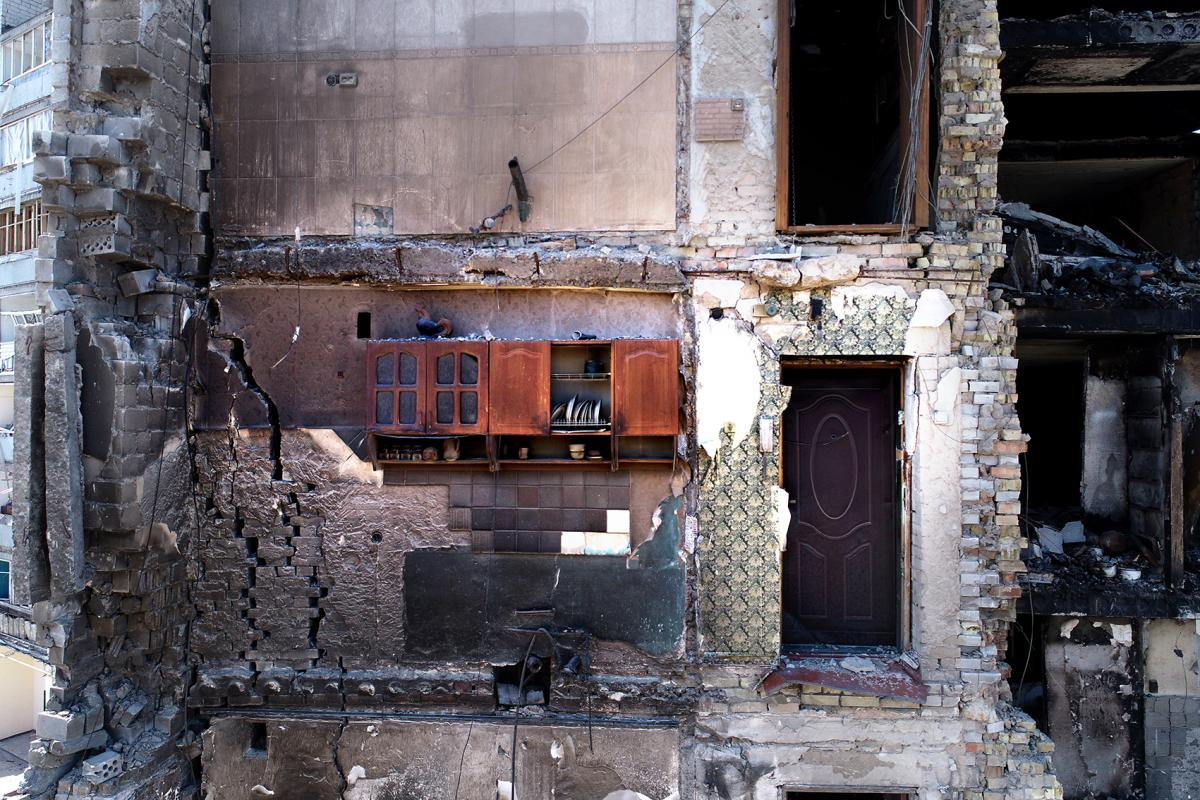
Kitchen cabinet with Vasylkiv maiolica rooster which survived destruction of a residential building

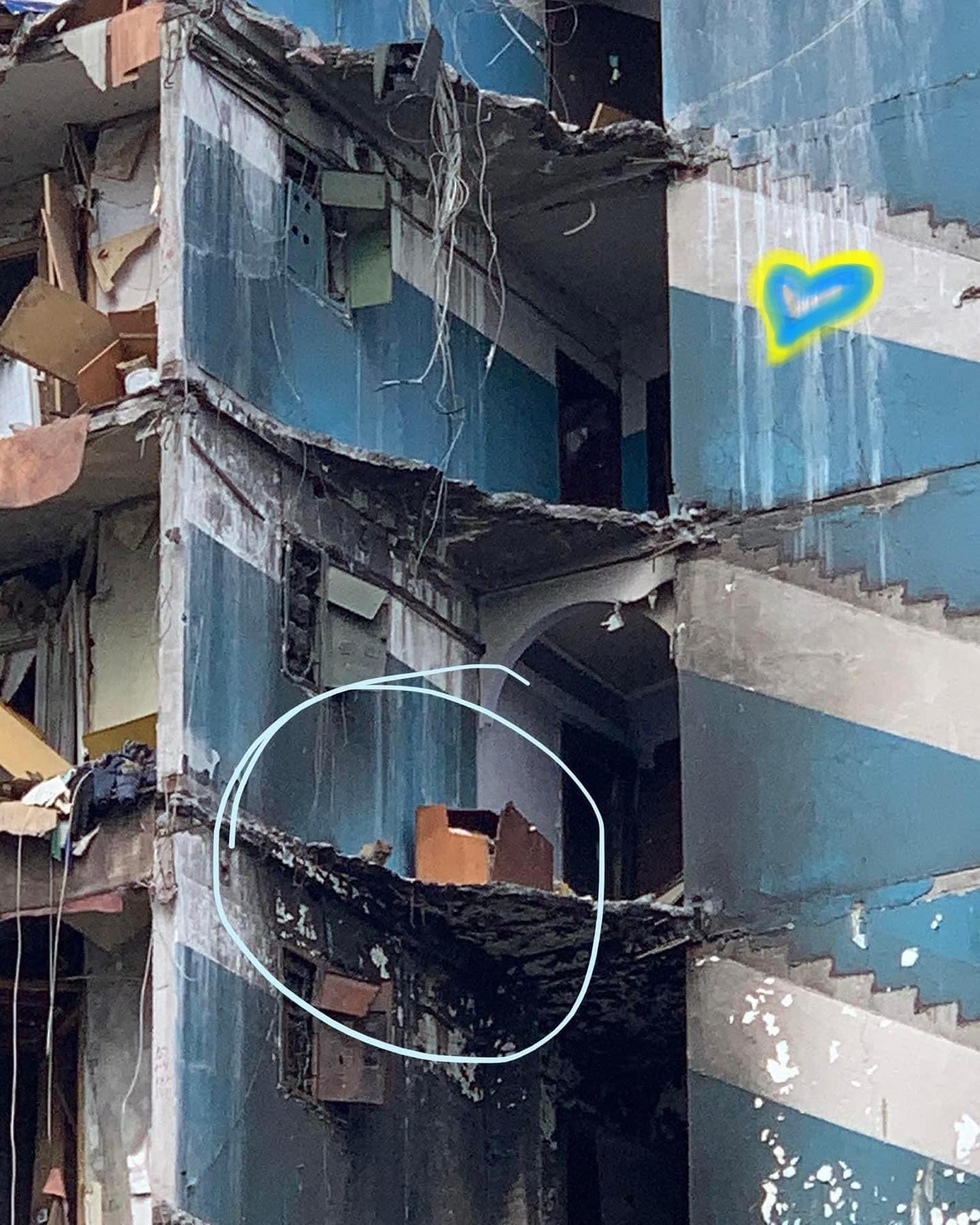
Cat rescued after two months from a dilapidated building, which became a symbol of Ukrainian resistance

== See also ==
- War crimes in the 2022 Russian invasion of Ukraine
