= Antonija Volk Krebelj =

Slovenian farmer and folk artist (1908–2003)

- Born: Antonija Volk; 1908; Suhorje, Austria-Hungary
- Died: 2003 (aged 94–95); Suhorje, Slovenia
- Occupations: farmer, factory worker, folk artist

Antonija Volk Krebelj (1908–2003) was a Slovenian farmer, a maker of Suhorje Easter eggs, folk artist, and preserver of folk art. She is best known for making and promoting Suhorje Easter eggs (suhorski pirhi). She was born and lived in Suhorje, where she learned the folk art from her mother and continued the tradition at a time when it was declining after the First World War and especially following the Second World War. Through her work, teaching, and public presentations, she played a key role in preserving and transmitting this distinctive form of Easter egg decoration to younger generations. Her legacy continues through her descendants, and the tradition of making Suhorje Easter eggs was entered into the Register of the Intangible Cultural Heritage of Slovenia in 2022.

== Childhood ==
She was born in 1908 at the Stane farm (Slovene: pri Stanetovih) in Suhorje. Her mother was the farmer and maker of Suhorje Easter eggs Marija Volk (1876–1956) from Suhorje, and her father was the farmer Franc Volk (died 1944). (Despite having the same surname, her parents are not known to have been related.) She had five sisters and three brothers.

Her mother made Suhorje Easter eggs every year, also known in Suhorje as pirihi. These eggs were usually hard-boiled hen's eggs dyed with onion skins, which coloured them in various shades of reddish-brown, and with the bark of brazilwood (which they called pražilka in Suhorje), which dyed the eggs red. After the egg had been dyed, her mother scratched designs into it with a small blade, such as flowers, hearts, and the symbols of faith, hope, and charity. In the 19th century, the making of Suhorje Easter eggs was widespread throughout the Brkini Hills, but later rapidly declined because of people's growing distance from the Church and the poverty that followed the World War I. Some people also ordered and bought Suhorje Easter eggs, and her mother made them on commission for others as well.

Antonija attended primary school in her home village. As a young girl, she was taught egg-making by her mother. One of her first independently made Easter eggs she gave to her teacher Pavla Hvala, who kept the egg through all her moves until her death. In childhood she also lived for some time in Ostrožno Brdo.

== Work ==
After finishing school, she worked on the family farm and made Easter eggs independently during Lent. A special motif characteristic of both her mother and herself was a bouquet of hearts, later adopted by her descendants. While still young, she married a local boy and had several children with him. They lived on her family farm. In addition to farm work, she was employed as a worker in Pivka. At that time, she often did not buy herself lunch, but instead saved the money for food and used it to buy books. She was especially fond of the poetry of Simon Gregorčič. Dzuring the Italian annexation, many of her Slovenian books were destroyed.

During the Second World War, she collected and prepared food for the Slovene Partisans. In 1942, two of her brothers were killed at the same time by the Germans as hostages. After their deaths, she and her husband took over the family farm.

After the Second World War, because of the new anti-religious authorities, the great majority of villagers stopped making Suhorje Easter eggs for Easter. Antonija decided to preserve the tradition and continued making them. In time she became known for this work, and people ordered and bought Easter eggs from her. They were popular souvenirs for Slovenes living abroad. She began making the eggs at the beginning of Lent and continued until Easter, but she also made them during the year on commission. She needed one hour to make a single egg. She taught the craft first to her daughter, and later to her granddaughters and great-granddaughters.

She began using new motifs that had not previously appeared on the eggs: geometric motifs, plant motifs, more detailed floral patterns, the burning heart, a heart with the inscription IHS, the Holy Spirit, the lamb, grapes, ears of wheat, little boats, a swallow, and a dove with an olive branch in its beak. She sometimes also scratched inscriptions onto the eggs, mostly devotional ones, but also the personal names of family members and friends, dedications to recipients, and the year in which the egg was made. In addition to hen's eggs, she also began making them from duck and goose eggs. When ostriches began to be raised in the Vreme Valley at the end of the 20th century, she sometimes used ostrich eggs as well.

After Slovenian independence, she also received public recognition for preserving this folk art. In April 1993, she received first prize in the CPZ Kmečki glas competition for the most beautiful Easter eggs. Her prize-winning eggs were exhibited at the Easter exhibition in Ljubljana Town Hall, co-organized by the Slovenian Ethnographic Museum. In 1993 and 1995, she exhibited her Easter eggs at the exhibition Easter in the Pivka Region at the Postojna Inner Carniola Museum. In 1995, the Ilirska Bistrica museum study circle issued a postcard featuring her Easter eggs. On Maundy Thursday, 13 April 1995, the post office at Prem 66255 used a commemorative postmark with the motif of her family's bouquet of little hearts. Around this time, she began presenting the tradition of decorating Easter eggs in nearby primary schools and led workshops teaching the "drawing of Easter eggs", as the making of Suhorje Easter eggs was called in Suhorje. She organized various workshops in schools, within her Catholic parish, and at events and exhibitions, where she passed her knowledge on to younger generations.

== Later life and death ==
In old age, she told collectors of folk tradition and wrote down a number of folk tales, village customs, and events from the history of her village. Even at an advanced age, she continued making Suhorje Easter eggs and teaching others how to make them. The last of her Easter eggs, preserved in the family archive by her daughter, dates from 2002. She died in 2003. She was buried in the cemetery at Suhorje in the grave of her parents.

== Legacy ==
Her work of preserving the folk art of making Suhorje Easter eggs is now continued by her daughter, granddaughters, and great-granddaughters. In April 2022, the making of Suhorje Easter eggs was entered in the Register of the Intangible Cultural Heritage of the Republic of Slovenia. Workshops on the making of Suhorje Easter eggs are regularly held in her birth house, where she lived for the most of her life.
