= Vasylkiv maiolica rooster =

Decorative pottery from Ukraine

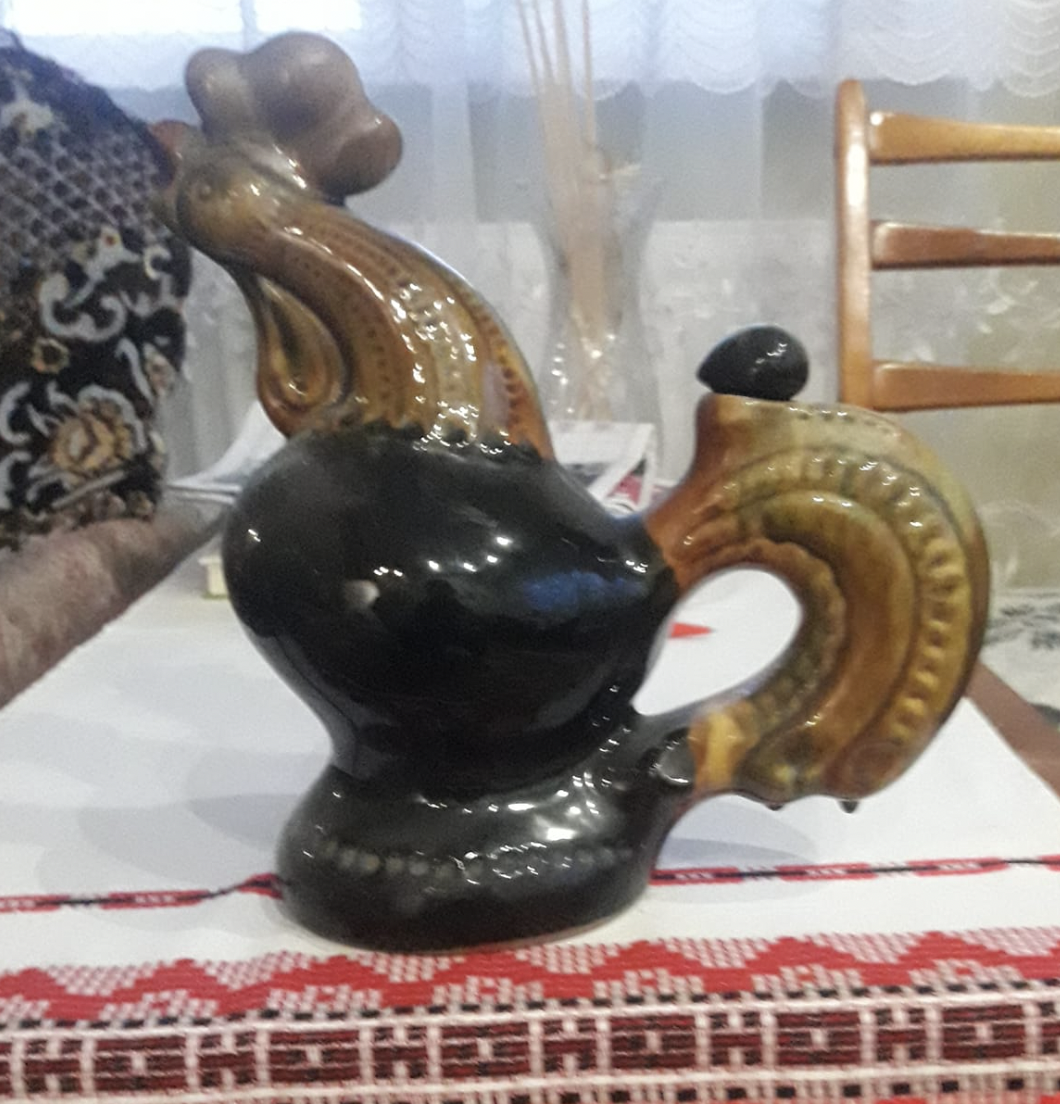
- Artist: Protoriev Valerii Semenovych, Protorieva Nadiia Yukhymivna
- Year: 1960–1980s
- Medium: Maiolica

Vasylkiv maiolica rooster (Ukrainian: Півник васильківської майоліки, romanized: Pivnyk vasylkivskoi maioliky) is a replicated decorative piece produced by the maiolica factory in Vasylkiv, created by Valerii Protoriev and Nadiia Protorieva. It became a symbol of resilience during the Russian invasion of Ukraine after a photo of one of the houses in Borodianka went viral: despite the flat being almost completely destroyed, a kitchen cabinet on the wall survived. Upon closer inspection, a decorative maiolica rooster was noticed atop it.

== History ==
The origins of the Vasylkiv maiolica rooster date back to the 18th century, when the town of Vasylkiv was a center of pottery production in Ukraine. The tradition of creating maiolica pottery in Vasylkiv was brought to the region by skilled craftsmen from Italy, and was further developed by local artisans. It became a symbol of Ukrainian folk art and culture.

The rooster was produced at the maiolica factory in Vasylkiv from early 1960s to 1980s. After a photo of the surviving cabinet with a rooster from a ruined house in Borodianka got famous all around the world, Ukrainian media and people on social networks became interested in this work of art. The cabinet was noticed and photographed by Yelyzaveta Servatynska and the deputy of the Kyiv City Council Victoria Burdukova drew everyone's attention to the rooster.

The rooster, together with the cabinet, were taken to the exposition of the National Museum of the Revolution of Dignity.

== Authors ==
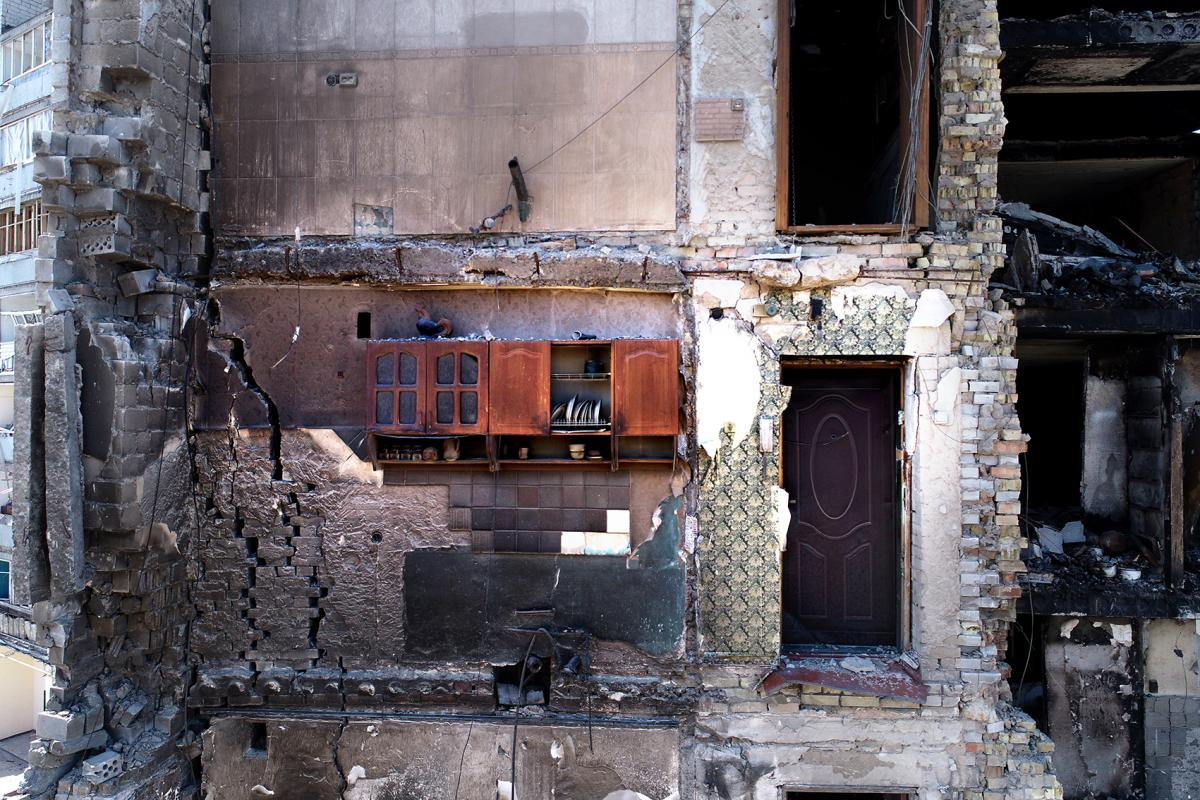
Ceramic rooster on a surviving cabinet in a ruined house, Borodianka, April 2022

The work was initially mistakenly attributed to Prokop Bidasiuk.

Serhii Denysenko, the chief artist of the Vasylkiv maiolica factory, believes that the authorship of the rooster belongs to Valerii Protoriev and his wife Nadiia.

== Symbol ==
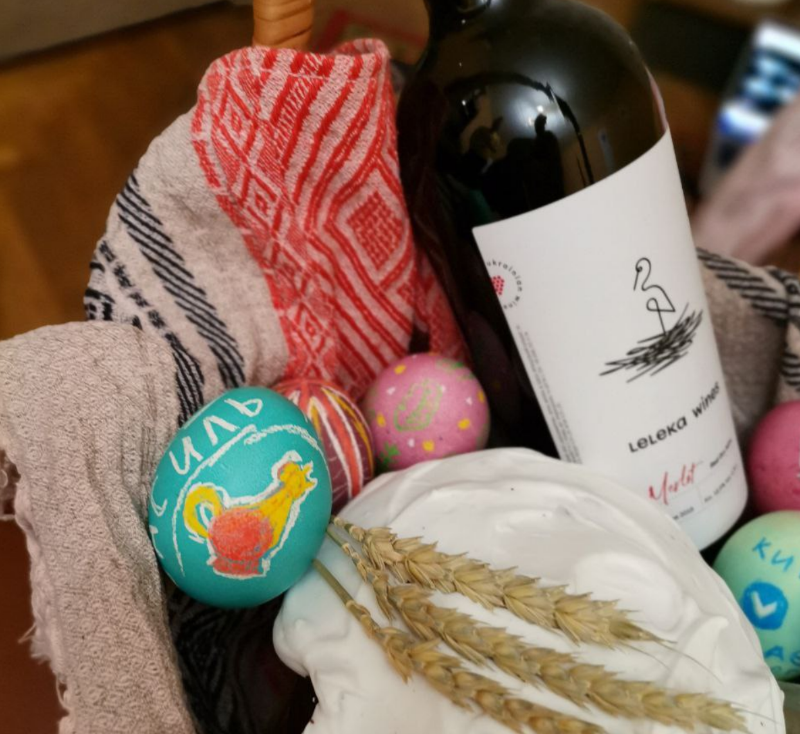
Pysanka with the Borodianka rooster

The kitchen cabinet with a rooster, which survived the bombing and remained on the wall, became a symbol of fortitude and perseverance. A meme appeared: "Be as strong as this kitchen cabinet". It is also mentioned as a symbol of the indomitable Ukrainian spirit.

The rooster appears in the illustrations of Olexandr Grekhov, Dima Kovalenko, Inzhyr the Cat. It is actively sought after on local online marketplaces.

The rooster has become one of the popular themes for pysanky (Easter eggs) – for example, the Lithuanian designer Laimės Kūdikis placed it on one. During the visit of the UK Prime Minister Boris Johnson to Kyiv on April 9, 2022, both he and the President of Ukraine Volodymyr Zelenskyi were presented with similar ceramic roosters.

== See also ==
- Raccoon of Kherson
- Kherson watermelon
