= Suhorje =

- Location in Slovenia
- Coordinates: 45°38′16.89″N 14°6′18.06″E
- Country: Slovenia
- Traditional region: Inner Carniola
- Statistical region: Littoral–Inner Carniola
- Municipality: Pivka

Area
  - Total: 5.67 km^{2} (2.19 sq mi)
- Elevation: 516.7 m (1,695 ft)

Population (2002)
  - Total: 64

Suhorje (pronounced [suˈxoːɾjɛ]) is a village in the hills southwest of Pivka in the Inner Carniola region of Slovenia.

The local parish church, built outside the settlement to the south, is dedicated to Saint Nicholas (Slovene: sveti Miklavž) and belongs to the Koper Diocese.

== Notable people ==
- Antonija Volk Krebelj (1908–2003), Slovenian farmer, maker of Suhorje Easter eggs, folk artist, and preserver of folk art
