= Selce, Pivka =

Selce
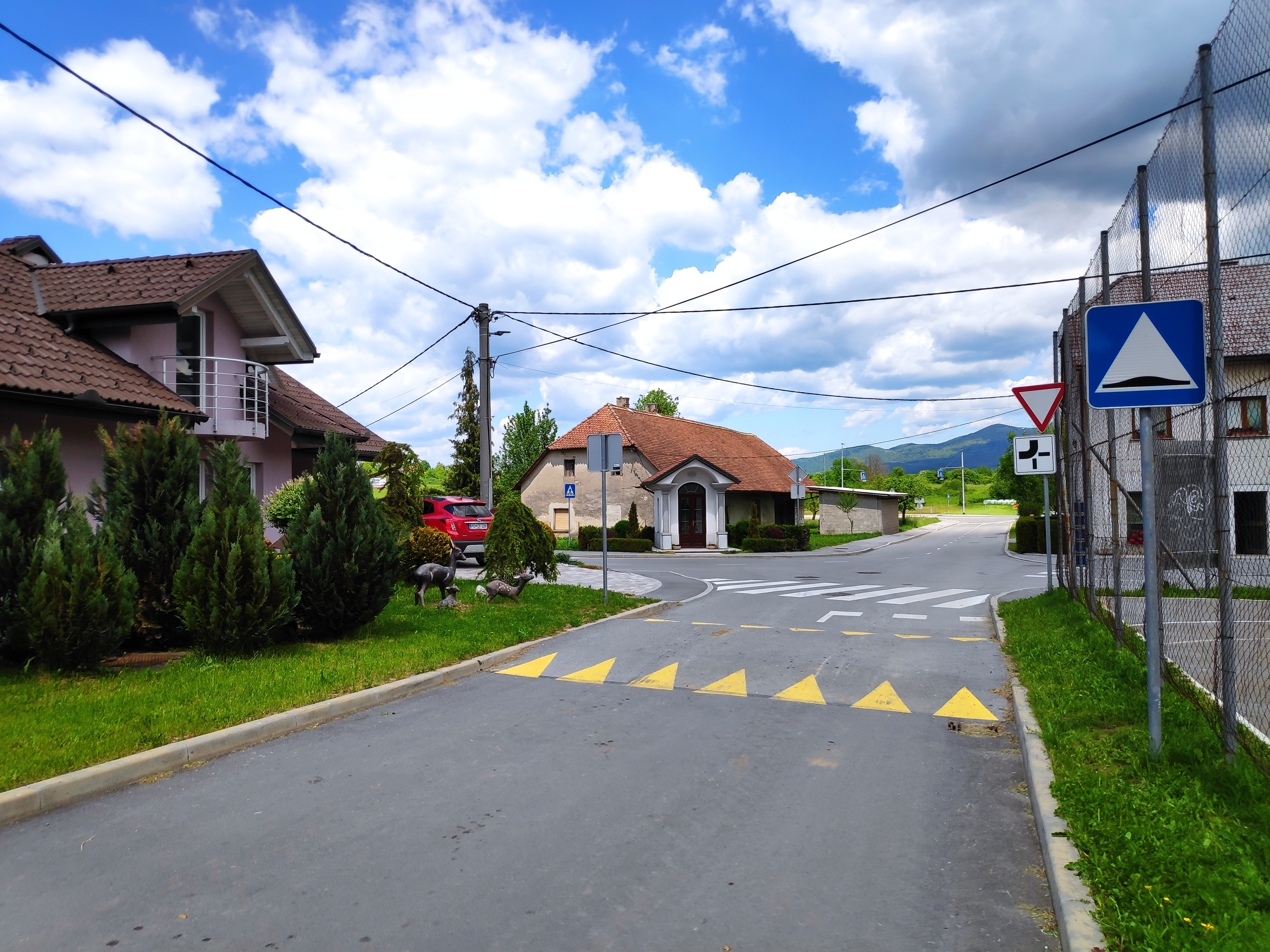

- Location in Slovenia
- Coordinates: 45°42′7.51″N 14°11′19.05″E
- Country: Slovenia
- Traditional region: Inner Carniola
- Statistical region: Littoral–Inner Carniola
- Municipality: Pivka

Area
  - Total: 10.3 km^{2} (4.0 sq mi)
- Elevation: 545.8 m (1,791 ft)

Population (2002)
  - Total: 216

Selce (pronounced [ˈseːu̯tsɛ], German: Selze) is a village north of Pivka in the Inner Carniola region of Slovenia.

== Geography ==
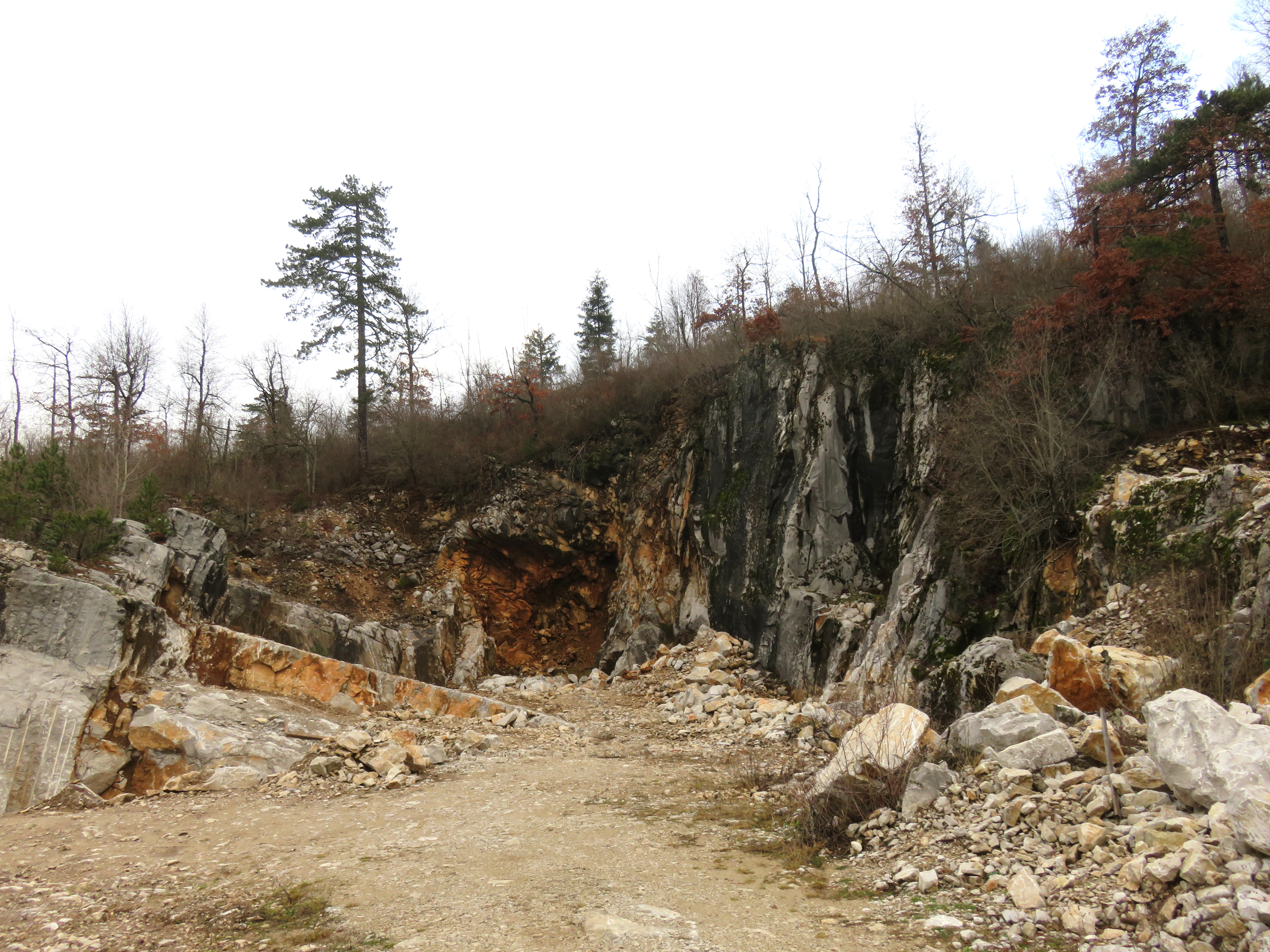
The Avsec Quarry

Selce is a clustered village in the Pivka Basin along the main road and rail line from Prestranek to Pivka. Most of the houses stand on a low, level area, and some are on the slope of Hrib Hill (elevation: 604 meters or 1,982 feet). There are cultivated fields to the west, below Matonk Hill (636 meters or 2,087 feet) and Podvršek Hill (654 meters or 2,146 feet). There are springs in the flysch rock below Matonk Hill; these have been developed as a source of water. During strong rains, Replje Spring below Osojnica Hill (821 meters or 2,694 feet) flows into a creek that becomes a tributary of the Pivka River. The Avsec Quarry (Slovene: Avscov preht) lies on the west slope of Osojnica Hill southwest of Selce.

== Church ==
The local church in the settlement is dedicated to the Holy Cross and belongs to the Parish of Slavina. It dates from the 17th century and was remodeled in the 18th century.

== Notable people ==
Notable people that were born or lived in Selce include:

- Matej Milharčič (1812–1853), a priest, missionary to Africa, and temperance campaigner
