= Seasonal lakes of Pivka =

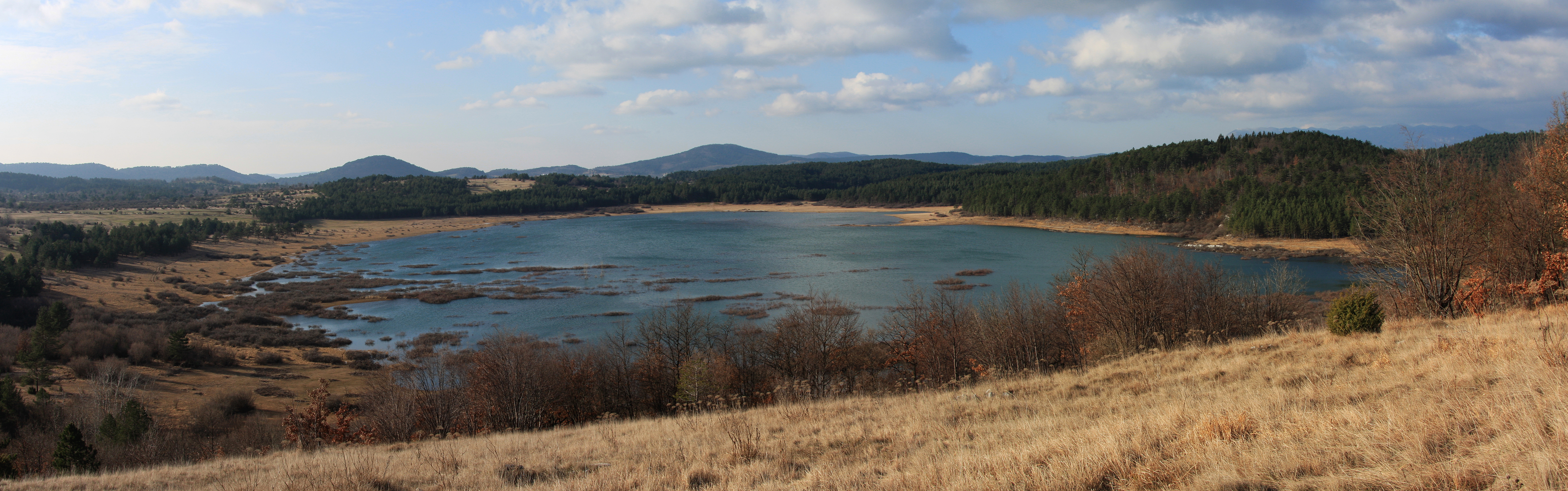
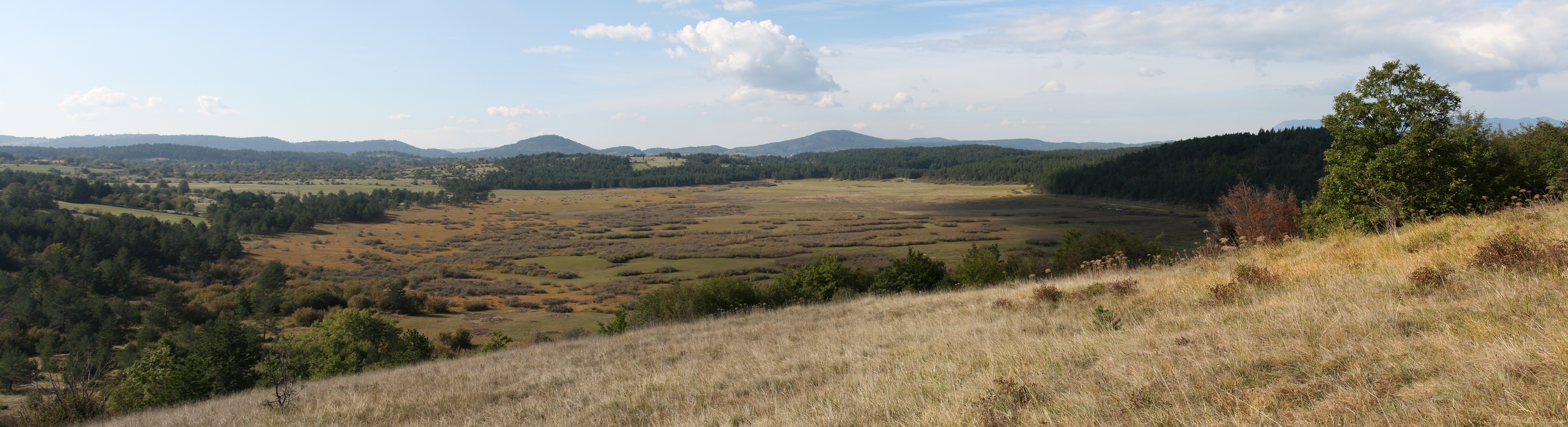
Lake Palčje is the largest among the Pivka seasonal lakes.
Top image: high water in December, after the autumn rains; bottom image: empty area in autumn, two months earlier.

The Pivka seasonal lakes are a group of 17 seasonal lakes; the best-known are Lake Petelinje and Lake Palčje, which is the biggest of them at about 1.9 square kilometres (0.73 sq mi). They are all located in Pivka Basin, Inner Carniola, Slovenia. Lake Jeredovce, the northernmost lake, is in Municipality of Postojna, 10 of them (Krajnikov dol, Lake Petelinje, Lake Radohovo, Lake Klenik, Lake Palčje, Lake Parje, Big and Little Lake Drskovče, and Big and Little Lake Zagorje) are in Municipality of Pivka and the southernmost 6 (Kljun Pond, Lake Kalec, Lake behind Kalec (Veliki dol), Lake Bač, Lake Lan, and Lake Šembije) are in the Municipality of Ilirska Bistrica, all of them are located at elevations between 549 metres (1,801 ft) and 570 metres (1,870 ft). There are also two areas (polje) that are only inundated during intense floods, so they are not officially considered among the Pivka seasonal lakes.

The lakes are located on a rocky terrace in the Upper Pivka Basin at the foothills of the Javornik Hills, rising above the Pivka riverbed. The terrace is dotted with a number of depressions with flat bottoms and sharp transitions at the banks, deep enough to reach the level of groundwater fluctuation. Thus, they are inundated after periods of stronger precipitation (late autumn and spring).

== List of lakes ==
There are total of 19 seasonal lakes, of which 17 are officially recognized. They are all listed from north to south in the table below:

Name	Elevation (m)			Area (m^{2})		Volume (m³)		Frequency of inundation	Coordinates	Image
Name	Bottom	Average area	Max area	Average	Max	Average	Max	Frequency of inundation	Coordinates	Image
Lake Jeredovce	537.5		542		90,197		113,428	rarely	45.729490°N 14.215185°E	
Krajnikov dol	537		540		21,513		18,849	rarely	45.719075°N 14.208201°E	
Lake Petelinje	532.2	541	545	647,157	736,341	4,128,712	6,891,976	often	45°42′24.69″N 14°13′33.82″E	
Lake Palčje	542.3	555	566	1,027,812	1,904,784	7,144,854	22,983,817	often	45°41′7.68″N 14°15′14.53″E	
Lake Klenik (Klenski dol)	544	545	547.5	3,689	36,830	1,330	57,565	rarely	45.679230°N 14.224306°E	
Lake Radohovo	534.2	535.6	536	7,455	15,519	14,221	22,434	often	45.675273°N 14.205231°E	
Lake Parje	538	540	542	29,798	37,231	46,060	114,594	often	45.667099°N 14.224827°E	
Little Lake Drskovče	539.2	540	544	41,120	82,657	52,593	327,782	often	45.663011°N 14.230118°E	
Big Lake Drskoče	541.7	545	549	186,334	207,547	441,427	1,247,611	often	45.658663°N 14.237718°E	
Big Lake Zagorje	549	550	551	16,552	23,479	19,920	39,085	rarely	45.653012°N 14.242114°E	
Little Lake Zagorje	544.2	548	548.5	39,425	44,552	83,100	103,768	often	45.651476°N 14.235818°E	
Lake behind Kalec (Veliki dol za kalcem)	553.8	555	556	15,001	18,496	26,729	42,125	rarely	45.643908°N 14.244197°E	
Kljun Pond	549.5	551	551	784	784	80	80	often	45.643181°N 14.239692°E	
Lake Bač	560.4	562.5	568	32,531	86,250	64,648	392,551	rarely	45.642401°N 14.256960°E	
Lake Lan	570.2		572		12,384		19,308	rarely	45.641655°N 14.260206°E	
Čičko polje (Note: Lake because of very rare activity, officially is not a seasonal lake)	568.5		576.5		591,419		591,417	very rare	45.629419°N 14.248502°E	
Lake Kalec	553.8	555 (Note: average water level was measured before the build of a drain canal which drastically decreased water level)	554.5	56,368	16,280	26,813	6,937	often	45.636331°N 14.239513°E	
Nariče	571.1		573		78,092		82,966	very rare	45.602804°N 14.256997°E	
Lake Šembije	558.8	560	569.9	12,381	93,561	11,274	549,971	rarely	45.601062°N 14.250922°E	

== Protection ==
The first attempts to protect the seasonal lakes date back to 1960s, but even after declaring Lake Petelinje and Lake Palčje living natural monuments (class II) of national significance, they were still used for military purposes. In 1984, the Municipality of Postojna issued a decree declaring Lake Palčje, Lake Petelinje, and Little and Big Lake Drskovče natural monuments and a decade later it expanded to 13 lakes. Despite this, the army still used Lake Palčje and Lake Petelinje, and other areas were becoming overgrown due to discontinuation of farming, so the area continued to degrade. Now, Lake Palčje and Lake Petelinje are protected as natural values of national significance, and other lakes as natural values of local significance. The lakes are also part of the Snežnik–Pivka Ecologically Important Area, the Snežnik–Pivka Special Protection Area, and the Javorniki–Snežnik Conditionally Special Protection Area.

In 2014, Pivka Seasonal Lakes Regional Park was established, encompassing all lakes in the Municipality of Pivka.
