= Pivka (disambiguation) =

Pivka is a town in Slovenia.

Pivka can also refer to:

== Places ==
- Municipality of Pivka, a municipality in Slovenia
- Pivka (river), a river in Slovenia
- Pivka Basin, or Pivka Valley, a region in Slovenia

== Other uses ==
- PIVKA, or protein induced by vitamin K absence
