= Pivka Basin =

The Pivka Basin or the Pivka Valley, also simply Pivka, is a varied basin in southwestern Slovenia, lying between high Dinaric plateaus, the Karst Plateau, and the Brkini Hills. It covers an area of 160 square kilometres (62 sq mi). To the northwest, it is bordered by Mt. Nanos, to the north, by Hrušica, to the east by the Javornik Hills and Mt. Snežnik, and to the west by the lower Slavina Plain and Tabor Hills. The lower part of the basin between Nanos and the Postojna Gate is known as the Lower Pivka Basin, and the upper part between Prestranek and Snežnik as the Upper Pivka Basin.

== Hydrology ==
The Black Sea–Adriatic Sea drainage divide crosses the Pivka Basin, with the majority of water flowing to the Ljubljanica Basin. The Pivka River with its tributary the Nanoščica sinks in Postojna Cave. Part of the water flows to the Lokva River, which sinks below Predjama Castle, merges with the sinking rivers Belščica, Stranske Ponikve, and Šmihelske Ponikve, and flows into the sources of the Vipava River. The Rakuljšica and some smaller creeks, tributaries of the Reka River, run on the southern edge of the basin, below Sajevče.

In the Upper Pivka Basin, there is a vertical bifurcation, with the surface waters running to the Black Sea Basin, and the underground waters to the Adriatic Sea Basin. The bottom of the basin, which is sometimes considered a karst field, has an elevation of 500 to 600 m (1,600 to 2,000 ft). The lowest point of the basin (464 m or 1,522 ft) is at the Lokva ponor below Predjama Castle.

== Climate ==
The natural and social influences of continental and littoral Slovenia intertwine in the Pivka Basin. Three climate types mix here: the Mediterranean, continental, and, higher at the edge, mountain climates.

== Natural and cultural landscape ==
The houses feature elements of the Inner Carniolan and Littoral types. After the stabilisation of Austria's land borders, Pivka administratively belonged to Carniola, and ecclesiastically, except for short interruptions, to the Diocese of Trieste. From 1918 to 1943, it belonged to Italy (the Trieste Province), and after World War II to Yugoslavia, where it was part of Slovenia.

The bottom of the Lower Pivka Basin is composed of impervious flysch bedrock, which at Razdrto continues into the flysch Vipava Valley. On the slightly rolling small plains along the Pivka and the Nanoščica, there are wet meadows, and small fields are found on the surrounding gentle rounded slopes. Settlements lie in elevated places among the alluvial plains. The location of villages was mainly determined by the agricultural orientation of the population because the settlements are connected to land that can be farmed.

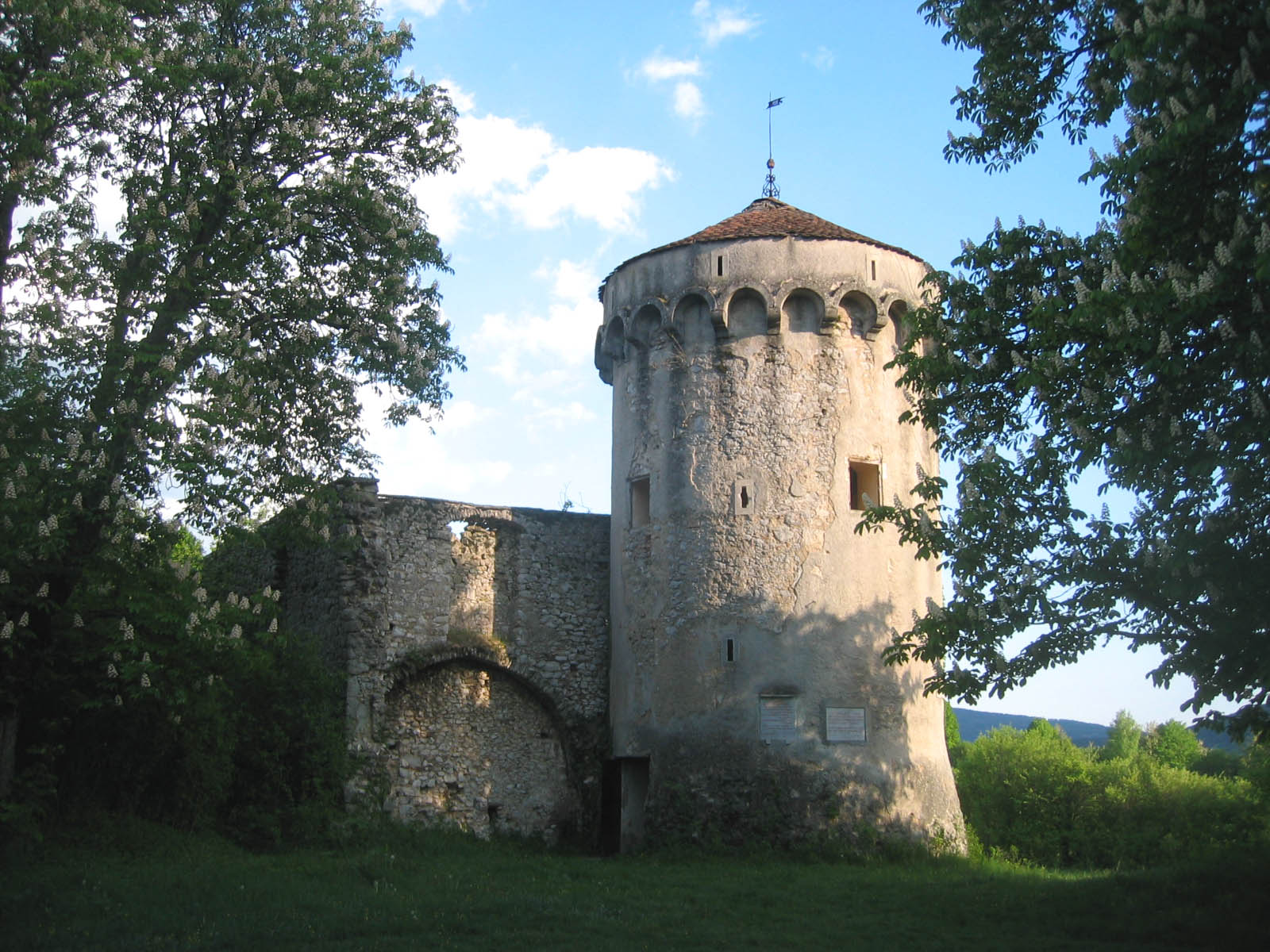
Kalec Castle near Zagorja, Pivka Basin

The largest settlement is Postojna, located at the entrance to the Postojna Gate, and on the opposite side lies Razdrto, which played a key role in transportation in the past. The Upper Pivka Basin and its upper margins, closing the basin from all sides, consists of Cretaceous limestone. The large karst field has a level bottom that is often flooded, traversed by the Pivka River, along which there is a higher level terrace with numerous sinkholes and larger basins with flat bottoms. When the level of karst water, which is always close below the surface, rises, the Pivka starts to flood near Zagorje. Floods occur along the Pivka, and the Pivka Lakes in depressions, among which the largest are Lake Palčje, Lake Petelinje, Lake Parje, and Lake Drskovče. The bottom of the Upper Pivka Basin is covered by a thin layer of eluvium. Higher-elevation parts have thin soil, suitable only for pasturing sheep or goats. The slopes are mostly covered by forest, primarily intentionally planted Austrian pine, spruce, and larch. The settlements in the Upper Pivka Basin are most dense along the western side of the basin. They lie next to flat basins filled with more recent deposits between Pivka and Šembije in the south, next to more open fields in the broader part of the basin between Pivka and Rakitnik in the north, and next to more or less extensive uvalas of the border part of the basin. The employment and supply centre of the Upper Pivka Basin is Pivka. The development of Pivka was most influenced by its location between two administrative, economic, and cultural areas. Despite their important transport location, the settlements in the Pivka Basin have not significantly developed. This is still only an area people pass through. The most important economic activities are forestry, wood processing and food processing, transport, tourism, livestock and poultry, and more recently sheep farming.
