= Pivka (river) =

River in Slovenia

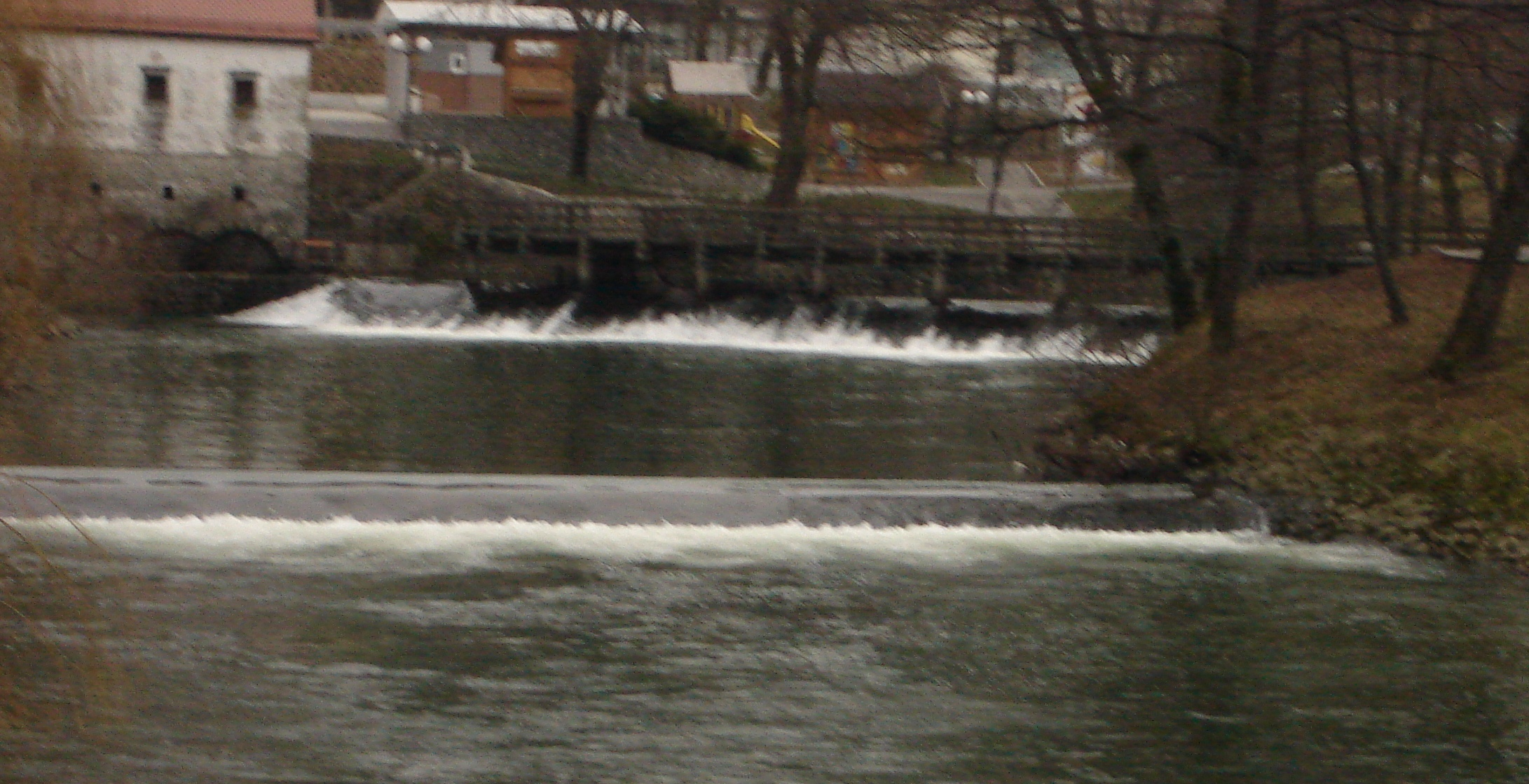
- Pivka River

Location
- Country: Slovenia

Physical characteristics
- Source
  - location: Zagorje, Pivka
  - coordinates: 45°38′20.47″N 14°13′41.59″E
  - elevation: 555 m (1,821 ft)
- Mouth
  - location: Flows to Postojna Cave
  - coordinates: 45°47′0.43″N 14°12′10.09″E
  - elevation: 510 m (1,670 ft)
- Length: 27 km (17 mi)
- Basin size: 262 km^{2} (101 sq mi)

Basin features
- Progression: Unica→ Ljubljanica→ Sava→ Danube→ Black Sea

The Pivka is a karst lost river in Slovenia. The river is 27 kilometres (17 mi) in length. The Pivka ends in Planina Cave, where it merges with the Rak River and then the Unica River. The confluence of the Pivka and the Rak is one of the largest subterranean confluences in Europe. Rising in limestone country south of Prestranek, it forms part of the classic Dinaric karst system and ultimately feeds the Ljubljanica—and thus the Black Sea basin—after disappearing underground in Postojnska jama. The Pivka created Postojna Cave, the longest cave system in Slovenia as well as one of its top tourism sites.

== Course and hydrology ==
From springs at the contact between Eocene and Palaeocene limestones near Zagorje, the Pivka meanders through the Pivka Basin, encircled by the karst plateaux of Nanos and Hrušica to the north, the Javorniki and Snežnik massifs to the east and south, and the Tabor range with the Slavenski ravnik to the west. South of Prestranek the valley floor is cut into permeable limestone; north of the settlement it crosses an impervious flysch depression, a contrast that governs the river's intermittence. Over the roughly 17 km to its ponor the gradient is barely 2.5 ‰.

During low water the groundwater surface may lie 10 m beneath the valley floor, restricting surface flow to the reach between Prestranek and Rakitnik. After prolonged rain or snow-melt the water table rises, springs at Pivšce discharge more than 1,500 litres per second, and the river runs continuously from Zagorje to Postojna Cave. The Upper Pivka also straddles the divide between the Adriatic and Black Sea catchments: part of its groundwater diverts beneath the Javorniki towards the Reka, while the remainder follows the Pivka–Ljubljanica–Sava–Danube route.

== Karst features ==
Normal karst groundwater levels fluctuate between 512 and 537 m above sea level, and when the water table breaches the valley floor at least fifteen closed depressions turn into temporary lakes. The largest, Palško jezero, may exceed 1 km^{2} and store more than 1.5 million cubic metres of water yet is usually dry for three-quarters of the year. Petelinjsko jezero, at the lowest elevation of the group, retains water longest—on average six months. Other basins that regularly flood include Jeredovci, Krajnikov dol, Klenško, Radohovo, Parsko, Veliko and Malo Drskovško, Veliko and Malo Zagorsko, Kljunov ribnik, Laneno (Jezero za gradom Kalc), Bačko and Kalško jezero. Peak stages on Palško and Petelinjsko coincide with the period, usually three to six months each year, when the Pivka carries surface flow through Prestranek; maxima occur in the autumn rain season and again in spring with snow-melt.

Matijeva jama, on the shore of Palško jezero, is the only substantial accessible water cave in the district. Acting as an estavelle, it can discharge up to 6 cubic metres per second after heavy precipitation yet reverses to swallow the waning flood; in drought its water surface may lie almost 40 m below ground—lower than the riverbed—implying a direct connection with the major karst springs at Malni near Planina. Structurally the area belongs to the External Dinarides, where the Snežnik thrust sheet overrides the Komen sheet. Upper Cretaceous limestone gives way westward to younger limestones and finally to flysch, keeping the impermeable base close to the surface and favouring shallow karstification; the resulting patchy conduit network explains the pronounced groundwater oscillations.

== Conservation ==
Because the Upper Pivka lakes and associated karst phenomena form one of Slovenia's most distinctive landscapes, the Municipality of Pivka has proposed their inclusion in the planned Notranjska–Snežnik Regional Park. Formal protection would safeguard both the hydrological regime and the specialised wetland communities that depend upon these intermittent water bodies.
