= Palčje =

Place in Inner Carniola, Slovenia

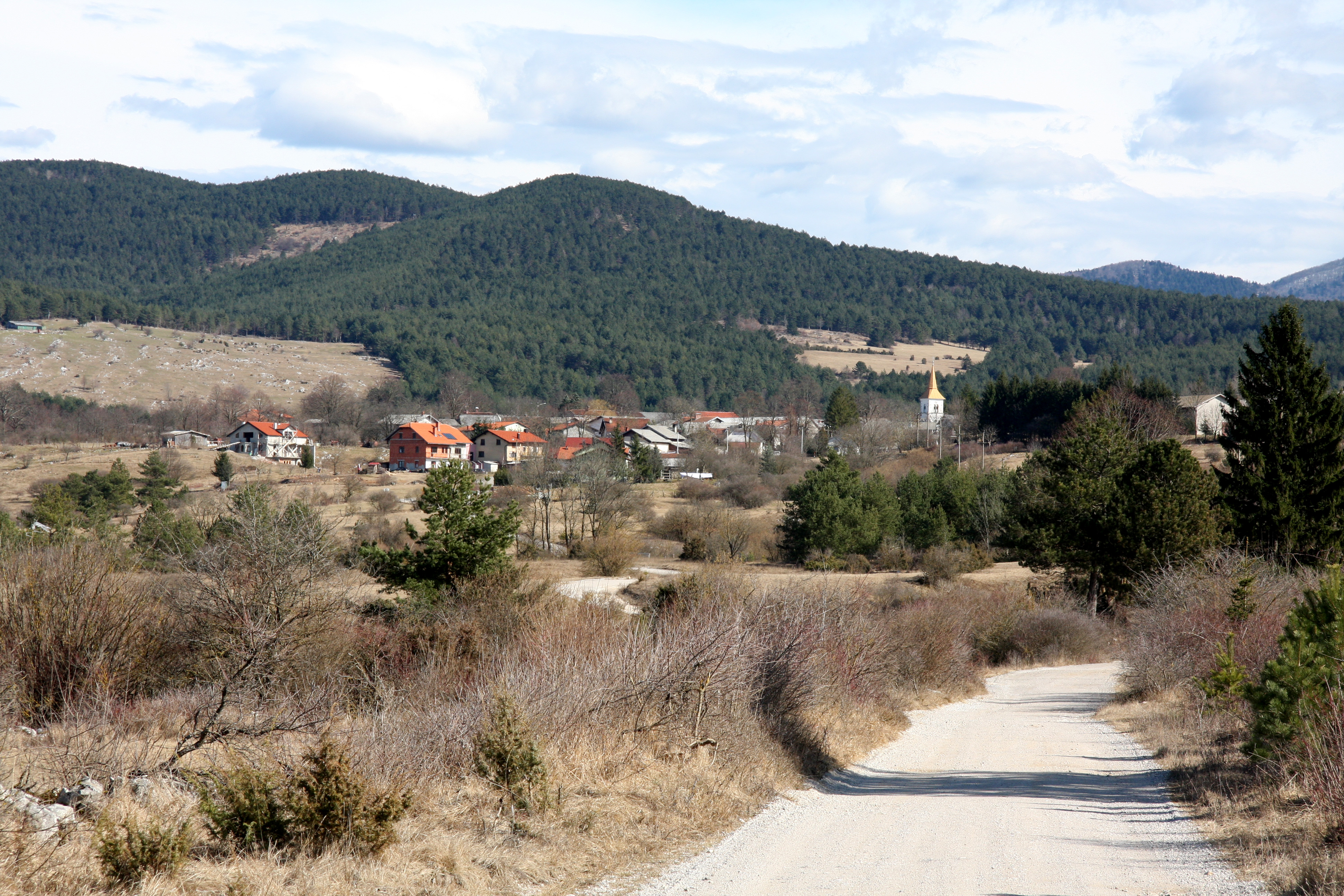

- Location in Slovenia
- Coordinates: 45°40′33.3″N 14°15′26.25″E
- Country: Slovenia
- Traditional region: Inner Carniola
- Statistical region: Littoral–Inner Carniola
- Municipality: Pivka

Area
  - Total: 30.58 km^{2} (11.81 sq mi)
- Elevation: 602.2 m (1,976 ft)

Population (2002)
  - Total: 208

Palčje (pronounced [ˈpaːltʃjɛ], in older sources Paličje, German: Palitschje) is a village east of Pivka in the Inner Carniola region of Slovenia.

== Geography ==
North of the village lies an intermittent lake named Lake Palčje. It is the largest among the Pivka lakes, with an average maximum water area around 1 square kilometer (0.39 sq mi). The highest elevations are in the Javornik Hills in the far eastern part of the settlement's territory, at Kozlovka Peak (Vrh Kozlovke, 1,047 meters or 3,435 feet), Mount Kalič (1,016 meters or 3,333 feet), and Mount Lamovšek (1,004 meters or 3,294 feet) above the small Prevale Valley.

== Name ==
Palčje was attested in written sources in 1498 as Palitschach. The medieval attestation indicates that today's name (a neuter singular) is derived from the accusative plural demonym *Paličane, derived from the common noun *palič, likely meaning 'small lake' (cognate with Lake Palić, Serbia), a diminutive of the Slavic noun palъ, preserved in the Slovene common noun pal 'mud' (and cognate with German Pfuhl 'puddle', English pool). The name thus refers to Lake Palčje north of the settlement.

== Church ==
The local church, built on the central village square, is dedicated to Saint Nicholas and belongs to the Parish of Trnje.
