= List of caves in Slovenia =

The following article is a list of caves in Slovenia. About 43% of Slovenian territory has a karst character, and over 14,000 caves (2021) are known in Slovenia.

== List of caves by number of visitors ==
The following show caves were the most visited in 2008 (ordered by the number of visitors):

1. Postojna Cave: 548,424 visitors
2. Škocjan Caves: 100,299 visitors
3. Hell Cave: 13,638 visitors
4. Predjama Cave: 6,133 visitors
5. Cross Cave: 4,935 visitors
6. Mayor Cave: 4,008 visitors
7. Pivka Cave and Black Cave: 3,509 visitors

== List of longest and deepest caves ==
It includes all the caves in the Slovenian cave registry, at least 1,000 m long and at least 300 m deep (March 2023). The list is sorted on a cave score, obtained as a sum of normalized length (divided by the length of the longest cave, multiplied by 100) and depth (divided by the depth of the deepest cave times 100); the maximum possible score would be 200.

#	Name	Wiki article	Length (m)	Depth (m)	Location	Score
1	Sistem Migovec	Migovec System	43,009	972	zaledje Tolminke	164.58
2	Sistem Mala Boka - BC4		11,875	1,319	Bovška kotlina	116.04
3	Čehi 2		5,536	1,505	Rombonski podi	113.24
4	Črnelsko brezno		20,066	1,393	Rombonski podi	112.29
5	Renetovo brezno-P4		12,296	1,322	Kaninski podi	101.82
6	Vandima		2,500	1,182	Rombonski podi	84.52
7	Sistem Molička Peč		3,817	1,130	Dleskovška planota	82.27
8	Brezno spečega dinozavra		2,147	1,081	Kaninski podi	76.82
9	Velika ledena jama v Paradani		7,311	858	Trnovski gozd	74.49
10	Macola		2,593	1,016	Kaninski podi	73.14
11	Pološka jama		10,800	704	zaledje Tolminke	72.61
12	Skalarjevo brezno		8,176	1200	Kaninski podi	71.93
13	Brezno pri gamsovi glavici		6,000	817	Bohinjske planine	68.64
14	Brezno pod velbom		2,665	910	Kaninski podi	66.84
15	Sistem pokljuškega grebena		9,584	643	Pokljuka	65.64
16	Postojnska jama	Postojna Cave	24,120	115	Pivška kotlina	65.32
17	Brezno pod žičnico		2,531	875	Kanin	64.19
18	Bela griža 1		2,054	884	Trnovski gozd	63.65
19	BC-10 (Kanin)		2,135	856	Kaninski podi	61.99
20	Grvn		7,765	566	Bohinjske planine	55.68
21	Kačna jama		20,200	280	Divaški kras	54.91
22	Devettisoča jama		2,382	671	Raduha	50.52
23	C 11 (Možnica)		1,074	644	zaledje Koritnice (Log pod Mangartom)	45.36
24	Brezno pri Leški planini		4,019	536	Jelovica	45.22
25	Predjama (jama)		17,945	168	Pivška kotlina	44.35
26	Vrtiglavica		643	643	Kaninski podi	44.26
27	Drugi sistem Moličke planine		3,349	542	Dleskovška planota	44.02
28	Brezno na Toscu		1,870	581	Bohinjske planine	42.84
29	[Brezno treh src]		763	621	Snežnik	41.98
30	Dol ledenica		1,822	543	Trnovski gozd	40.44
31	Edijevi vhodi		774	519	Dleskovška planota	36.34
32	4-P		1,030	495	Rodica	35.28
33	Brezno Bogumila Brinška		585	506	Snežnik	35.02
34	Habečkov brazen		1,402	476	Črnovrška planota (Idrija)	34.98
35	[Evklidova piščal]		2,453	429	Pokljuka	34.37
36	Čaganka		2,431	475	Poljanska gora (nad Belo krajino)	34.07
37	Brezno presenečenj		950	472	Dobrovlje (Vransko)	33.63
38	Majska jama		650	480	Bohinjske planine	33.44
39	Brezno Martina Krpana		806	451	Bohinjske planine	31.90
40	Cefizlova jama		860	449	Bohinjske planine	31.89
41	Ferranova buža		3,093	358	zaledje Vrhnike	31.19
42	Škocjanske jame (sistem)	Škocjan Caves	6,138	254	Divaški kras	30.18
43	Jamski sistem Sežanske reke		1,501	394	Sežanski kras	29.77
44	[Sistem SuRovka]		1,596	385	Kanin	29.40
45	Ponor polne lune		1,873	370	Banjšice	29.06
46	Jama pred Kotlom		900	404	Slavnik	28.99
47	Jama pod Debelim vrhom		689	410	Bohinjske planine	28.89
48	Zelške jame (sistem)		7,338	160	Rakov Škocjan	28.18
49	Klomsko brezno		499	384	Ratitovec	26.70
50	P-41 (Kanin)		782	367	Kaninski podi	26.26
51	Letuško brezno na Dedcu		888	361	Dleskovška planota	26.11
52	Jama 1 v Kanjaducah		1,332	329	Sežanski kras	25.05
53	Kamrica jama		534	351	Snežnik	24.60
54	Jesenska jama		875	338	Kamniška Bistrica	24.55
55	Jazben		868	334	Banjšice	24.27
56	Zgubljeno brezno na Raduhi		939	327	Raduha	23.98
57	Davorjevo brezno		5,887	304	Brkini	23.73
58	Vodna jama v Lozi		7,748	75	Slavinski ravnik (Prestranek)	23.51
59	Dimnice (jama)		6,020	134	Matarsko podolje	23.30
60	Ljubljanska jama		1,120	310	Kamniška Bistrica	23.28
61	Žalčevo brezno		398	336	Snežnik	23.28
62	Ledena jama 1 na južni strani Studorja		2,345	286	Bohinjske planine	23.23
63	Brezno Velikega Talirja		673	320	Kaninski podi	22.87
64	Brezno zadnjega poskusa		580	320	Kriški podi	22.65
65	Dobra Nada		1,112	300	Trnovski gozd	22.59
66	Golerjev pekel		645	316	Logarska dolina	22.54
67	Vikend brezno		1,435	279	Jelovica	21.97
68	Križna jama	Cross Cave	8,273	32	Loško polje	21.91
69	Klemenškov pekel		455	310	Logarska dolina	21.69
70	Žirovcova jama		5,994	106	zaledje Vrhnike	21.37
71	Azaleja (Kanin)		470	302	Kaninski podi	21.19
72	Black Jack		457	302	Kaninski podi	21.16
73	J 10		410	300	Rombonski podi	20.91
74	Najdena jama		5,216	121	Planinsko polje	20.51
75	Planinska jama	Planina Cave	6,859	65	Planinsko polje	20.43
76	Velika in Mala Karlovica		8,057	20	Cerkniško polje	20.07
77	Lipiška jama		1,400	250	Sežanski kras	19.96
78	Logarček		4,888	120	Planinsko polje	19.66
79	Ledeno špičje		1,118	255	Krnsko pogorje	19.61
80	Gradišnica		1,170	250	Logaški travnik	19.41
81	Burja		1,099	248	Kozina	19.11
82	Kamniška jama		1,570	226	Kamniška Bistrica	18.77
83	Hotiško-Slivarski jamski sistem		2,644	180	Matarsko podolje	18.28
84	Beško-Ocizeljski sistem		2,780	150	Podgorski kras (Črni Kal)	16.62
85	Jazbina v Rovnjah		2,233	160	Matarsko podolje	15.97
86	Novokrajska jama		1,297	188	Jelšanska brda	15.59
87	Šimnova jama		2,054	153	Mežakla	15.08
88	Gašpinova jama		3,375	103	Logaški ravnik	14.91
89	Huda Luknja (sistem)		3,030	119	dolina Pake	14.75
90	Prepadna jama		1,557	151	obronki doline Kolpe (Kostel)	13.75
91	Pucov brazen		2,235	110	Hotenjski ravnik (Hotedršica)	12.65
92	Hrušiške ponikve		1,036	152	Matarsko podolje	12.58
93	Kamenšca		1,023	147	Matarsko podolje	12.22
94	Podstenska jama		3,376	60	Mala gora (Ribnica)	12.06
95	Podpeška jama		4,390	20	Dobrepolje	11.83
96	Tkalca jama	Weaver Cave	2,885	71	Rakov Škocjan	11.62
97	Medvedjak		1,092	129	Matarsko podolje	11.18
98	Čendova jama		1,040	126	Baška grapa	10.86
99	Viršnica		2,796	60	Radensko polje	10.68
100	Obrh Čolniči		2,700	61	Cerkniško polje	10.51
101	Martinska jama pri Markovščini		1,004	120	Matarsko podolje	10.37
102	Jama v Kofcah		1,090	103	Velika planina	9.45
103	Križna jama 2		1,415	89	Loško polje	9.29
104	Trbiška zijalka		1,112	99	Zgornja Savinjska dolina	9.24
105	Prekova jama		1,028	100	Hleviška planina	9.10
106	Revenov brazen		1,236	95	Hotenjski ravnik (Hotedršica)	9.01
107	Vipavska jama		1,932	64	Vipavska dolina	8.87
108	Račiške ponikve		1,070	94	Brkini	8.81
109	Snežna jama na planini Arto		1,327	75	Raduha	8.15
110	Kostanjeviška jama		1,871	47	Gorjanci	7.59
111	Jama and Dolinskim jarkom		1,858	46	Gorjanci	7.50
112	Osapska jama		1,607	54	Podgorski kras (Črni Kal)	7.43
113	Ponikve v Jezerini		1,224	63	Matarsko podolje	7.12
114	Pekel pri Zalogu		1,500	40	Ponikovski kras (Polzela)	6.25
115	SV 6/93		1,126	46	Dleskovška planota	5.75
116	Boka		1,425	84	Kanin	5.74
117	Jama Kreščak		1,279	38	Gorjanci	5.58
118	Izvir Bilpa		1,180	41	dolina Kolpe (Kostel)	5.54
119	Kmetov brazen (sistem)		1,149	41	Hotenjski ravnik (Hotedršica)	5.23
120	Tajna jama 1		1,300	30	Ponikovski kras (Polzela)	5.10
121	Mitjina jama		1,027	39	Matarsko podolje	5.05
122	Željnske jame		1,600	12	Kočevsko polje	4.63
123	Lekinka		1,032	17	Pivška kotlina	3.60

== See also ==
- List of caves
- List of Dinaric caves
- Speleology
