= Čehi 2 cave =

Cave in Slovenia

Čehi 2
- Liptovska priepast 1, Ceki 2: La vendetta
- Location within Slovenia
- Location: Municipality of Bovec, Slovenia
- Coordinates: 46°22′0.7″N 13°30′36.3″E
- Depth: 1505 m
- Length: 5536 m
- Elevation: 2033 m
- Discovery: 17. 7. 1991
- Geology: limestone
- Entrances: 1
- Registry: Slovenian Cave Registry

Čehi 2 on the Rombonski podi plateau to the north of Bovec is the deepest cave in Slovenia and, as of 2026, the 15th deepest in the world. It is 1505 meters deep and 5536 meters long. There is a siphon at the bottom. The entrance is located 2033 meters above the sea level. The cave was discovered in 1991 and its final depth was achieved in 2002.

== See also ==
- List of caves in Slovenia
- List of deepest caves
