= Postojna Cave =

Cave system in Slovenia

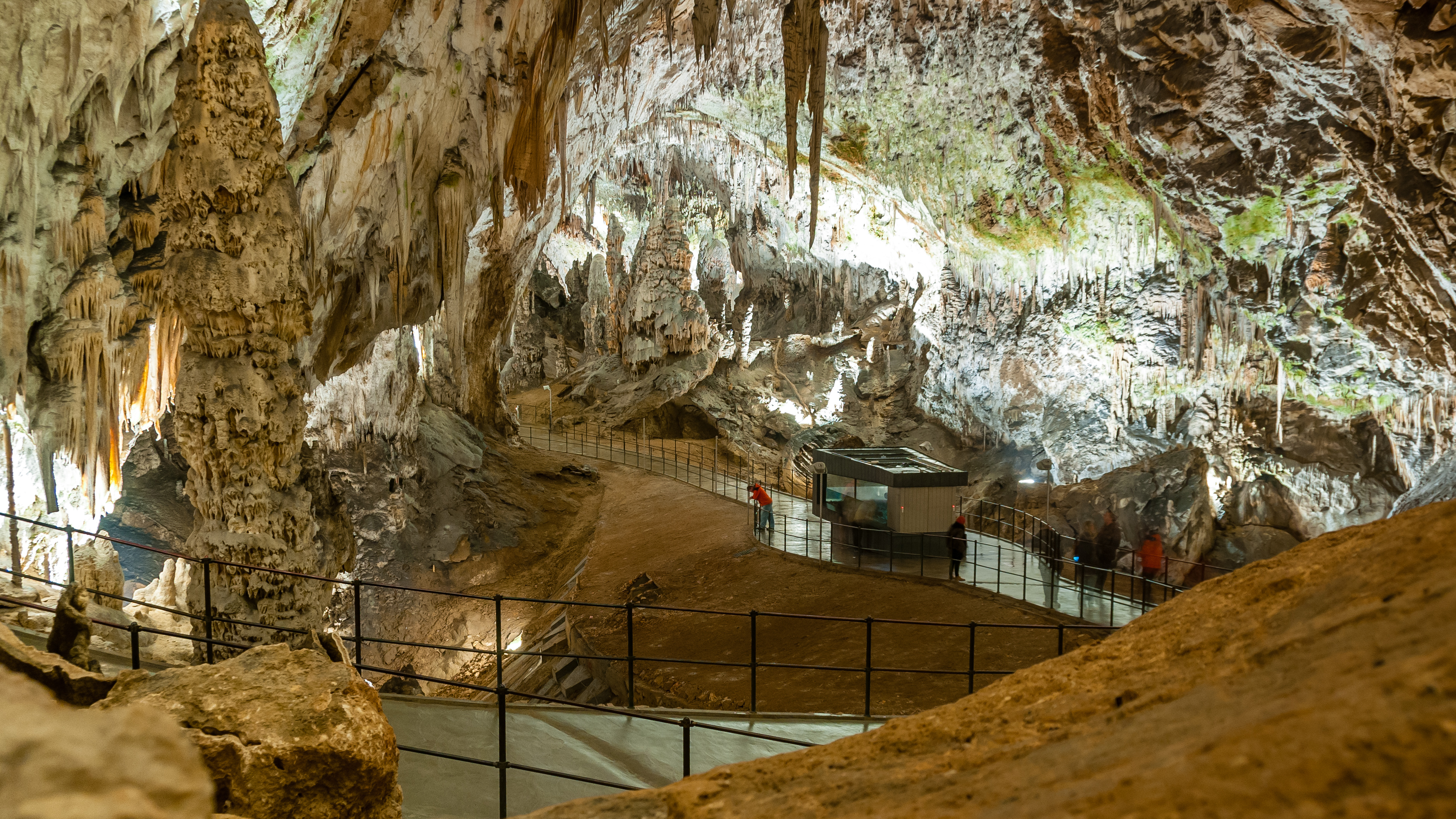

- Location within Slovenia
- Location: Postojna, Slovenia
- Coordinates: 45°46′57.6″N 14°12′13.2″E
- Depth: 115 m (377 ft)
- Length: 24.34 km (15.12 mi)
- Geology: limestone
- Access: by train
- Registry: Cave E-Cadastre
- Cadastral code: SI00955

Postojna Cave (Slovene: Postojnska jama; German: Adelsberger Grotte; Italian: Grotte di Postumia) is a 24.34 km (15.12 mi) long karst cave system near Postojna, southwestern Slovenia. It is the second-longest cave system in the country (following the Migovec System) as well as one of its top tourism sites. The caves were created by the Pivka River.

== History ==
The cave was first described in the 17th century by the pioneer of study of karst phenomena, Johann Weikhard von Valvasor, although graffiti inside dated to 1213 indicates a much longer history of use. In 1818, when the cave was being prepared for a visit by Francis I, the first Emperor of Austrian Empire, a new area of the cave was discovered accidentally by Luka Čeč, a local man in charge of lighting lamps in the cave. In the 1850s, the Austrian-Czech geographer Adolf Schmidl published the first comprehensive scientific overview of the Postojna caves and the Pivka Basin, which became a standard reference point in the study of speleology.

=== First tourist guide and electric lighting ===
In 1819, Archduke Ferdinand visited the caves, this is when the caves became officially known as a tourist destination. Čeč became the first official tourist guide for the caves when the caves were opened to the public. Electric lighting was added in 1884, preceding even Ljubljana, the capital of Carniola, of which the cave was part at the time, and further enhancing the cave system's popularity.

In 1872, cave rails were laid along with first cave train for tourists. At first, these were pushed along by the guides themselves, later at the beginning of the 20th century a gas locomotive was introduced.

During World War I, Russian prisoners of war were forced to construct a bridge across a large chasm inside the cave.

=== Mid-century changes ===
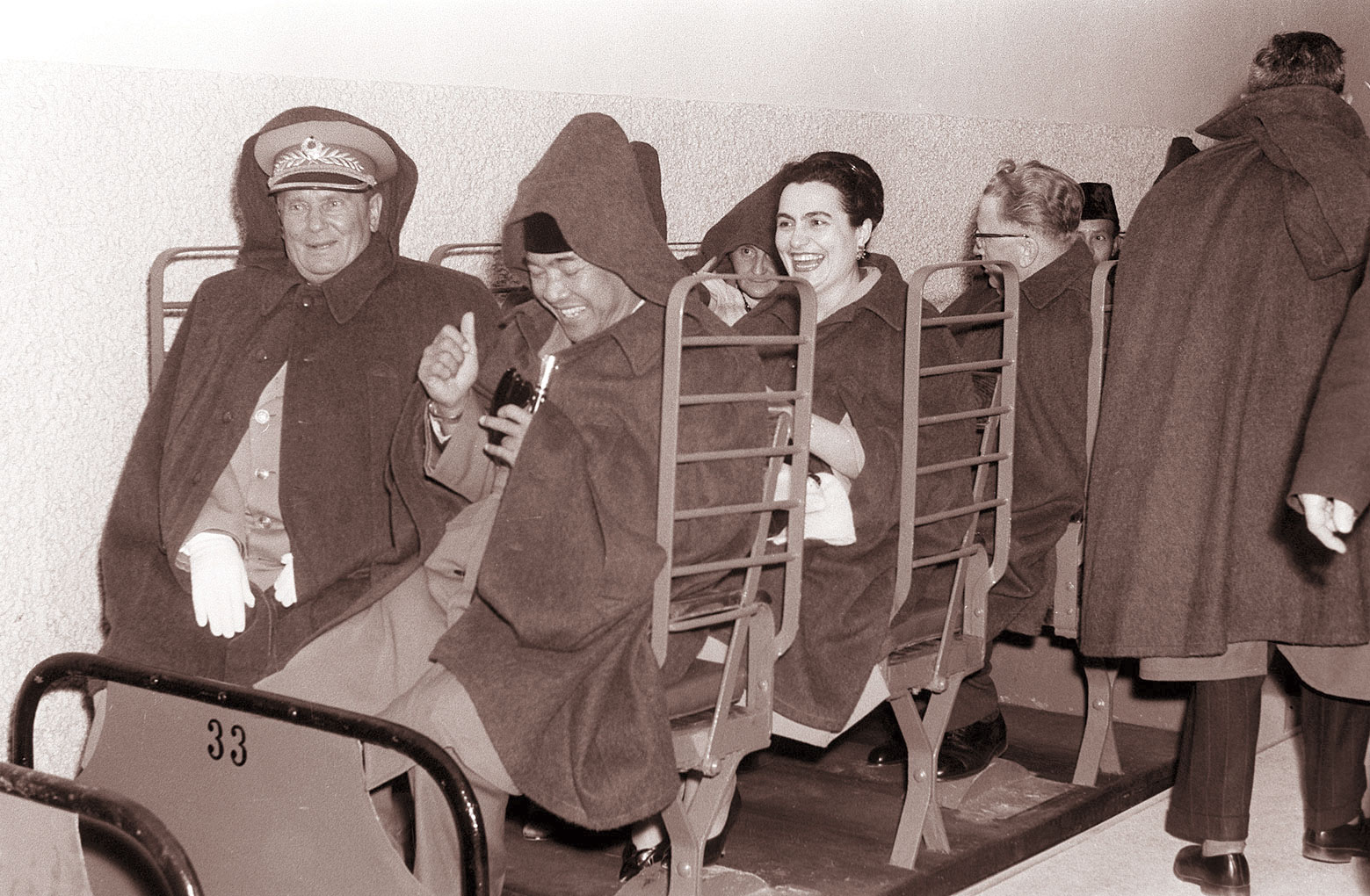
Tito and Sukarno at the cave, 1960

During World War II, German occupying forces used the cave to store nearly 1,000 barrels of aircraft fuel, which were destroyed in April 1944 by Slovene Partisans. The fire burned for seven days, destroying a large section of the cave and blackening the entrance.

After 1945, the gas locomotive was replaced by an electric one. About 5.3 kilometres (3.3 mi) of the cave system are open to the public.

At the end of the 1990s it was one of world's most visited show caves, with nearly 1 million tourists per year.

=== 21st-century tourism ===
In June 2015 and May 2017, the cave administration reported that cave divers managed to explore a further underwater section of the cave leading towards Planina Cave, thus lengthening the cave system from 20,570 m (67,490 ft) to 24,340 m (79,860 ft). The cave also houses the world’s first and only underground post office which initially opened in 1899.

== Natural environment ==
Postojna Cave was carved by the Pivka River over millions of years. There are stalagmites, stalactites, and formations called curtains or draperies that look like folded curtains.

The cave system is 24.34 kilometers (15.12 mi) long and is made up of four caves interconnected through the same underground river. However, according to speleology rules, the passages and siphons connecting the caves must be walked or swum through by man for them to be considered one whole. Connecting two of the main cave systems will make this the longest cave system in Slovenia and one of the longest in all of Europe. There remain 400 meters (1,300 ft) between the two caves, which would make the cave system between 31,000 meters (102,000 ft) and 35,000 meters (115,000 ft) long.

The caves are also home to the endemic olm, the largest troglodytic amphibian in the world. The tour through the caves includes an aquarium with some olms in it. On January 30, 2016, a female olm at the cave began to lay over 50 eggs. This rare event led to global news about Postojna Cave and the olm. From the end of May to mid-July 2016, twenty-two baby olms successfully hatched.

== Postojna Cave tour ==
While the cave system is 24 km long, only 5 km is open to the public. Of this, 3.5 km is traversed by a train that takes visitors through the cave; the remaining 1.5 km can be navigated on foot and with a guide. The whole tour takes about 1.5 hours.

The temperature inside the cave is around ten degrees Celsius (fifty degrees Fahrenheit).

== Permanent exhibition ==
The exhibition "EXPO Postojna Cave Karst" was opened in April 2014. It is the largest permanent exhibition about the cave and karst phenomena around the world. The exhibition features interactive presentations about the history of the tourism-related development of the cave. Visitors learn about karst phenomena through projections of various material onto a three-dimensional model, discover the special features of the karst environment, and learn about historic events at Postojna Cave on the Wall of Fame. The exhibition is of interest to both the general public and experts. Children are interactively guided through the exhibition by an olm and a slenderneck beetle, and can ride a cave train by themselves.

== Gallery ==
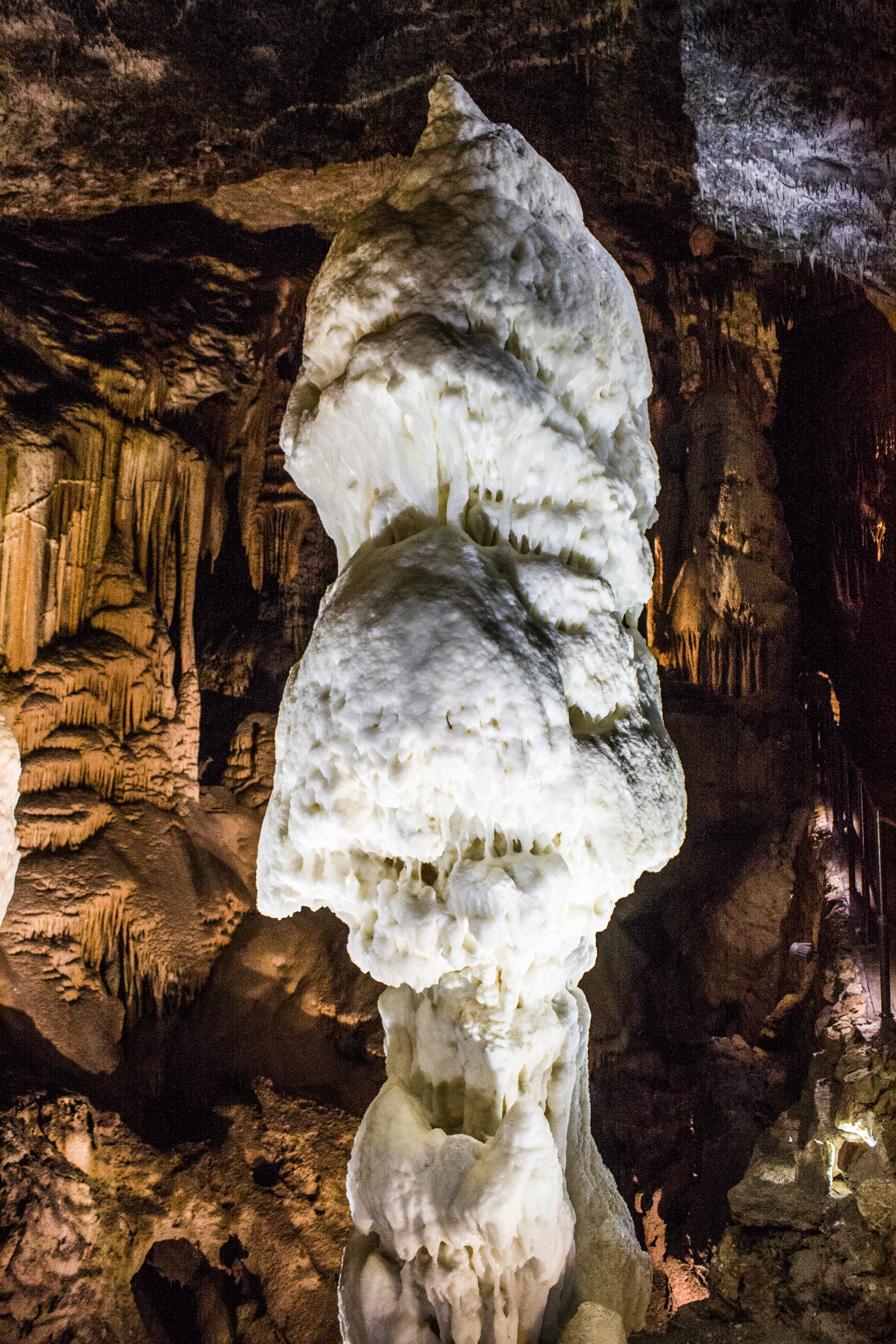
Brilliant, the symbol of Postojna Cave

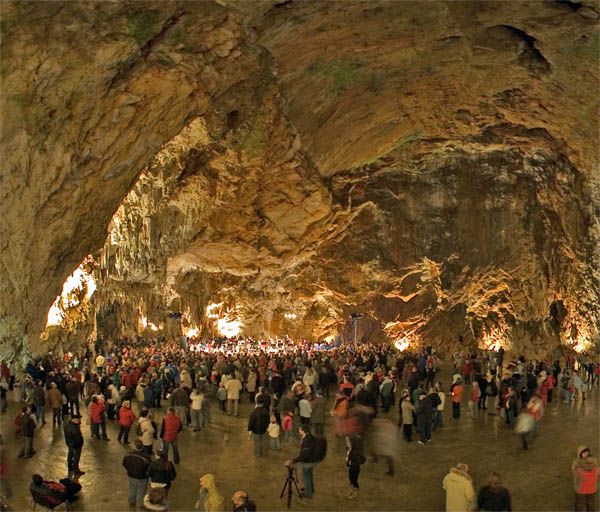
Concert Hall, known for its exceptional acoustics, has sufficient space for 10,000 people. Symphony orchestras, octets, and a variety of soloists perform here.

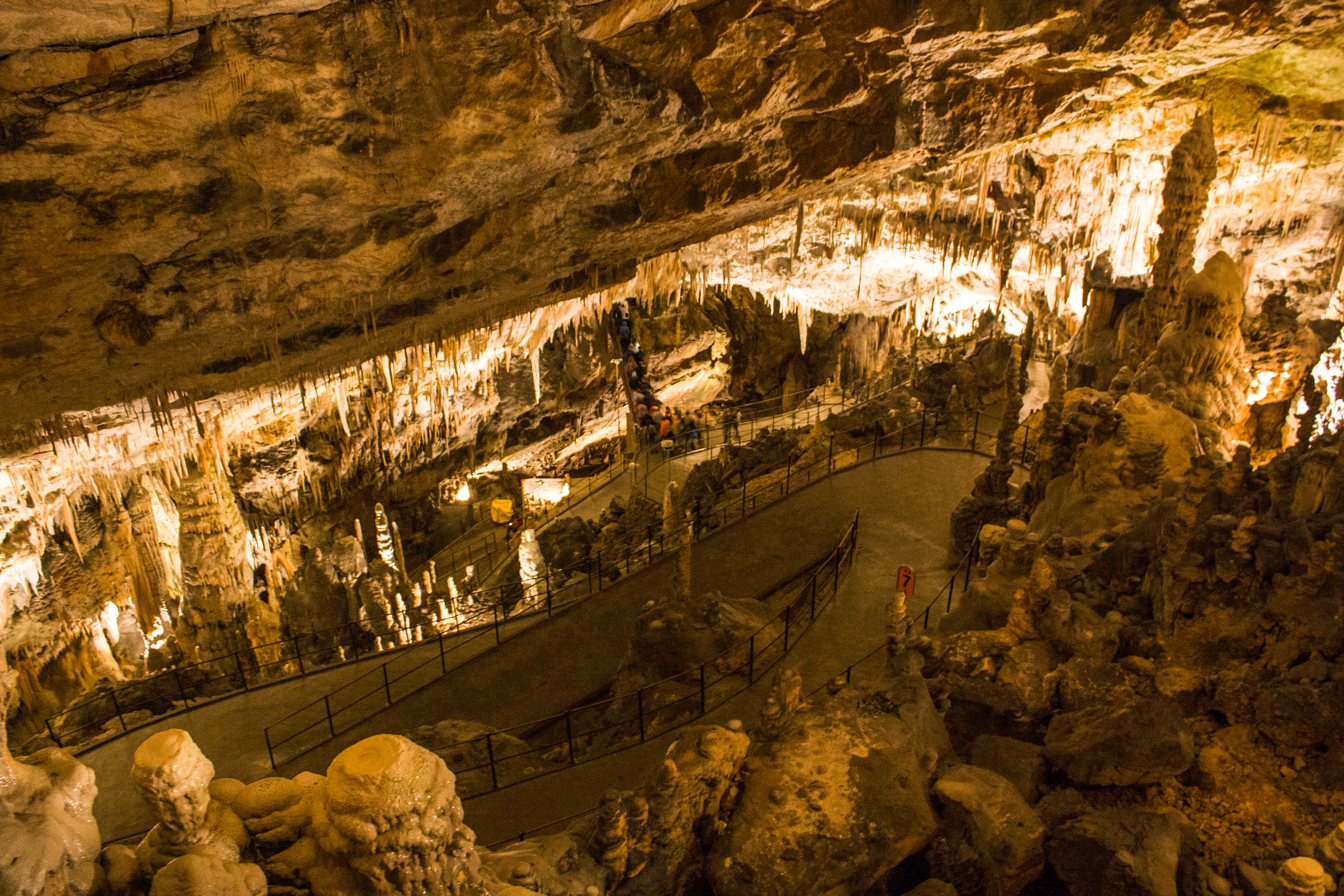
Big Mountain Hall

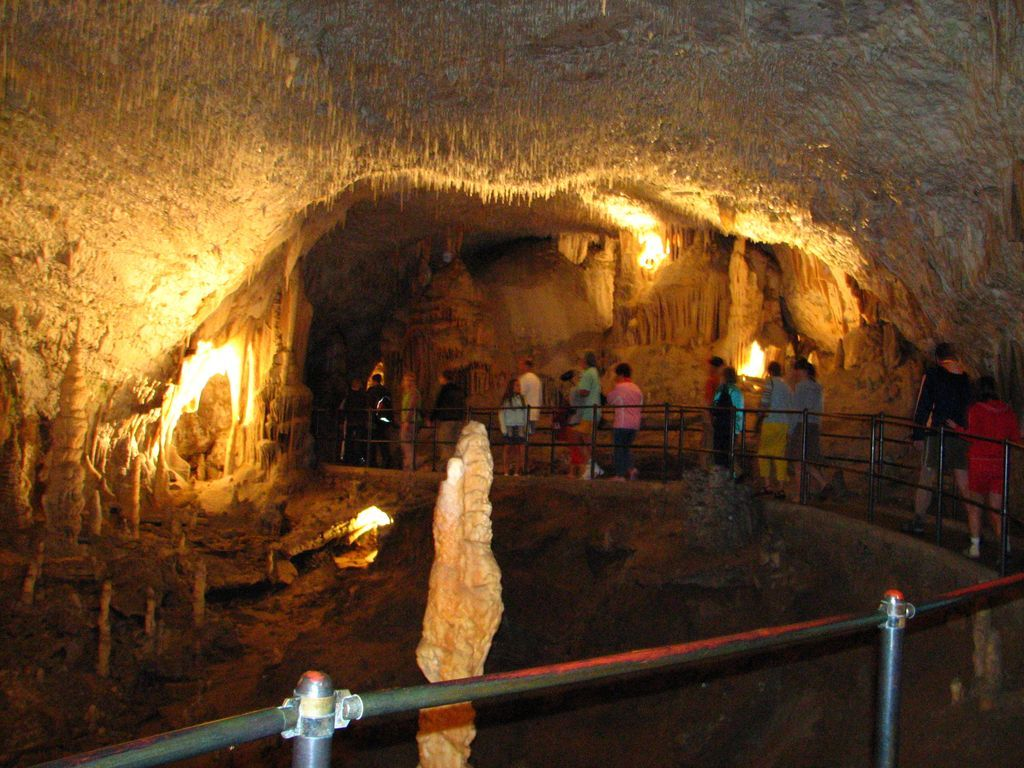
Tube (or Spaghetti) Hall

Cave train

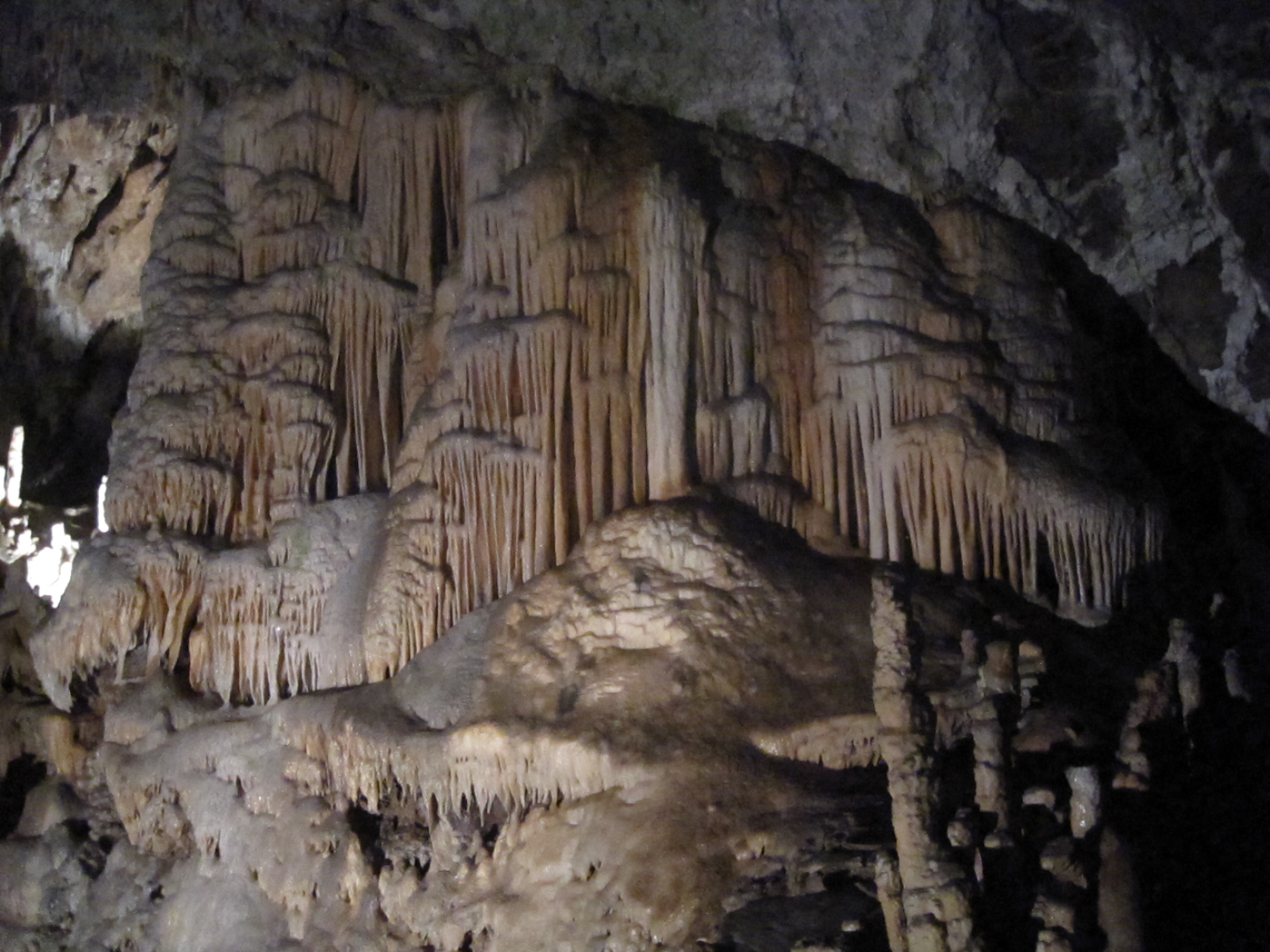
A formation of stalagmites deep underground in Postojna Cave

== See also ==
- List of caves in Slovenia
- New Athos Cave in Georgia, also with its own railway
