= Migovec System =

Cave system in Slovenia

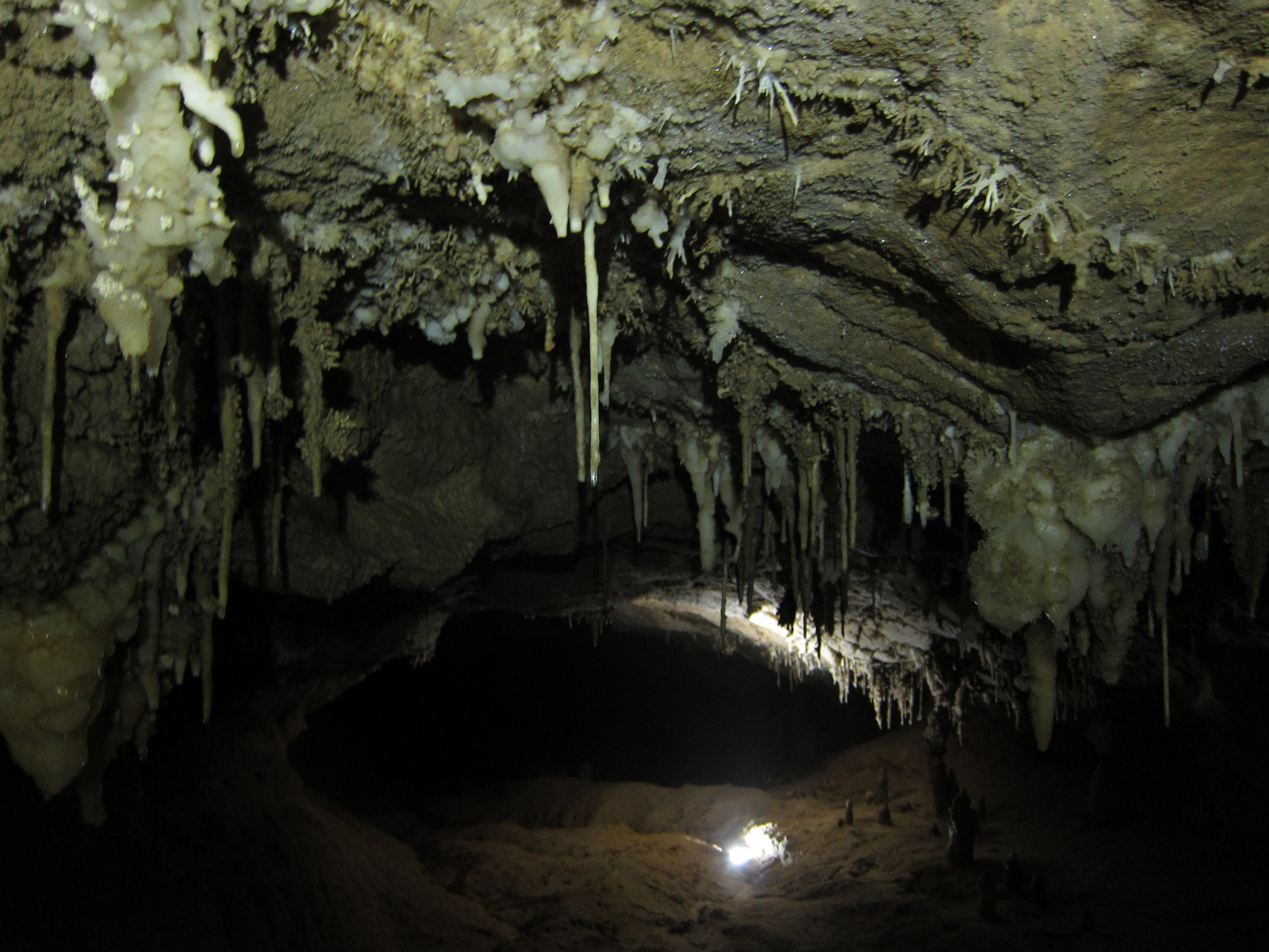

- Location within Slovenia
- Location: Tolmin, Slovenia
- Coordinates: 46°15′07.1″N 13°45′50.4″E
- Depth: 972 m (3,189 ft)
- Length: 45,329 m (148,717 ft)
- Geology: limestone

The Migovec System (Slovene: Sistem Migovec) is a 43,009-metre-long (141,000 ft) and 972-metre-deep (3,190 ft) Alpine cave system within Mount Tolmin Migovec (Tolminski Migovec) in the Municipality of Tolmin in northwestern Slovenia. The mountain and the cave system are part of Triglav National Park. The combined system is the longest known cave in the country, followed by the Postojna Cave System (24,340 m or 79,900 ft).

== Entrances ==
The entrances include:

- Chough Cave (Kavkna Jama) (M2), first explored in 1972; the highest entrance to the system, at 1861 m above sea level
- M16, first explored in 1982
- Torn T-Shirt Cave (Jama Strgane Srajce) (M18), first explored in 1994
- Gardeners' World (Vrtnarija), first explored in 2000
- Fairies' Cave (Vilinska Jama), first explored in 2008
- Primadona, first explored in 1999, collapsed in 2018
- Monatip, first explored in 2007
- Belladonna, first explored in 2018, after the collapse of Primadona

== Exploration ==
The majority of exploration has been carried out by the Caving Section of the Tolmin Mountaineering Club (Jamarska Sekcija Planinskega društva Tolmin), joined since 1994 by Imperial College Caving Club.

Chough Cave (M2), Torn T-Shirt (M18), and M16 were connected together in 1996 to form the initial Migovec System, which was then explored to an eventual depth of −970 m (−3,180 ft). In 2008, exploration of Fairy Cave led to an almost immediate connection with Gardeners' World, and on 13 August 2012 Gardeners' World was connected to the Migovec System at a depth of −650 m (−2,130 ft).

Primadona and Monatip, two entrances located on the Western cliff of the Migovec plateau form a cave that was first explored in 1999. The cave had been explored to a length of 2.7km before being connected to the rest of the Migovec System at a depth of −180 m (−590 ft) in late 2015.

== See also ==
- List of caves in Slovenia
