= Lake Palčje =

Intermittent lake in Slovenia

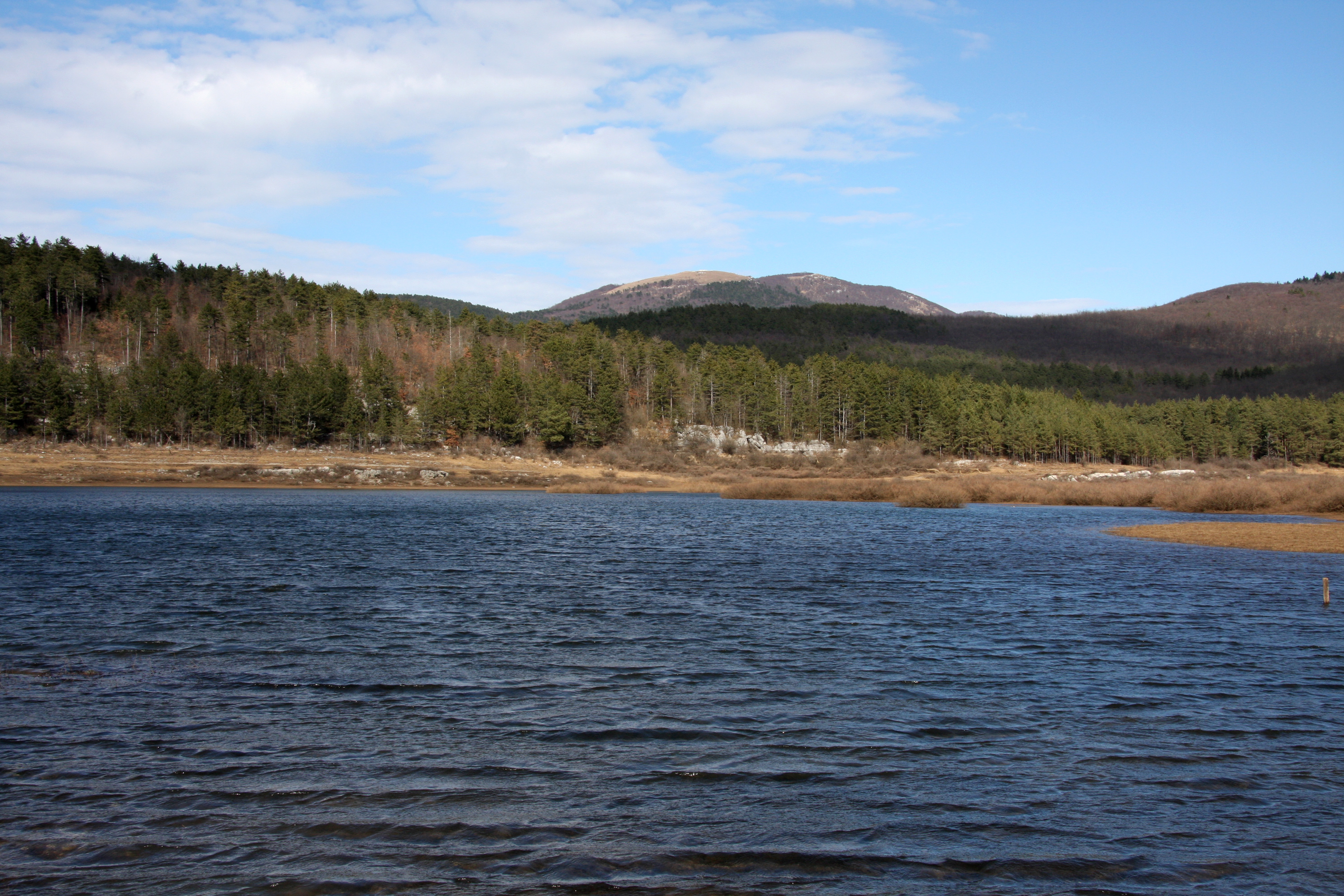
- View from the end of the lake towards the northeast

- Location within Slovenia
- Location: Pivka municipality, Slovenia
- Coordinates: 45°41′15″N 14°15′09″E
- Type: intermittent lake
- Primary inflows: Matija's Cave
- Basin countries: Slovenia
- Max. length: ~1.5 km (0.93 mi)
- Max. width: ~0.5 km (0.31 mi)
- Surface area: 1 km^{2} (0.39 sq mi) (max.)
- Max. depth: 25 m (82 ft)
- Water volume: 1.5 million cubic metres (1,200 acre⋅ft) (max.)
- Settlements: Palčje

Lake Palčje (Slovene: Palško jezero) is an intermittent lake in the Pivka basin north of the settlement Palčje in the Inner Carniola region of Slovenia. It fills an oval-shaped karst depression, crossed by Pivka, and approximately 1.5 km (0.93 mi) long and 0.5 km (0.31 mi) wide. Its bottom is relatively level at between 543 and 557 m (1,781 and 1,827 ft) above sea level, but the banks are steep. Lake Palčje is the largest among the Pivka Lakes with average maximum water area around 1 km^{2} (0.39 sq mi).

The bottom is at groundwater level, so the amount of water depends on current hydrological conditions. Usually, the lake fills after the heavy rains in late autumn and again in spring. On average, the area is flooded for around three months every year. The lake's main inflow is the estavelle Matija's Cave (Matijeva jama) out of which the water flowing from the Javornik Hills erupts.

== Use ==
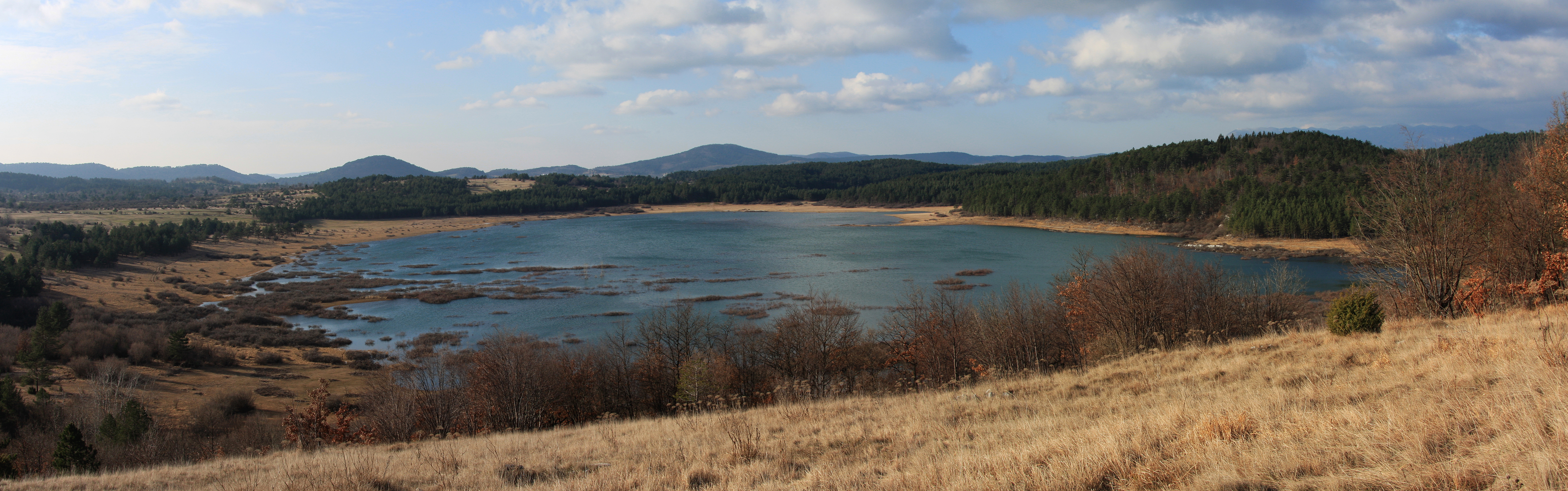

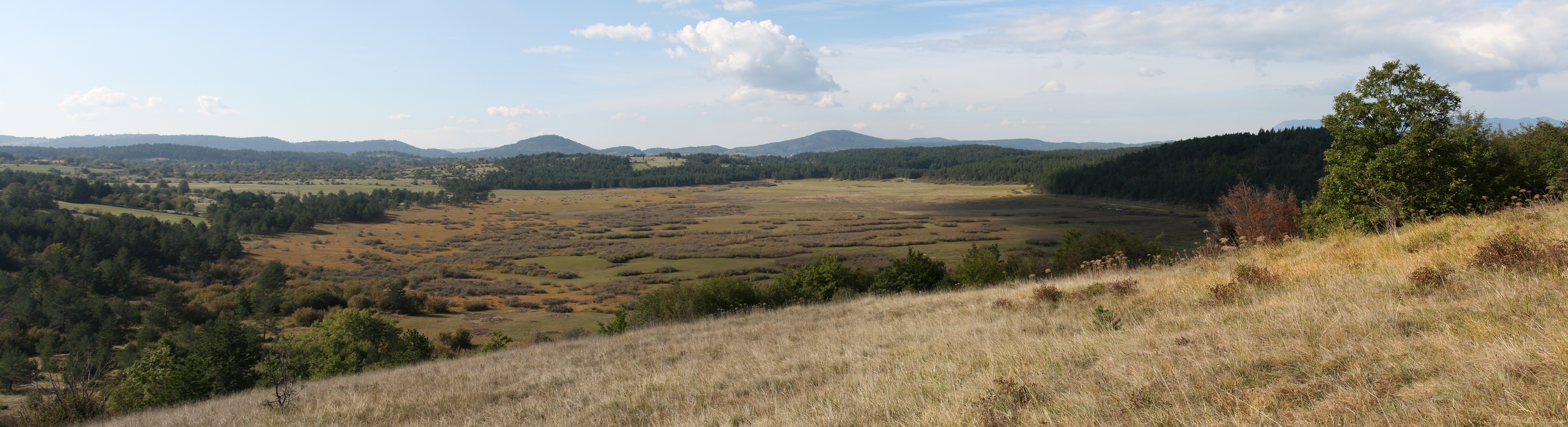
Lake Palčje almost full in winter (above) and the drained area in autumn (below)

The area is filled with water for significant part of the year, so the lake's bottom cannot be used for agriculture, but the grassy surface makes it possible to allow grazing livestock and harvesting hay. The farmers in nearby Palčje begin mowing at the end of July, when they finish with surrounding pastures. The garlic that grows on the bottom affects the taste of the milk, so the hay is used for feeding horses instead of cattle.

Ice-making was a supplementary source of income for locals from the end of the 18th century until the middle of the 20th century; farmers from Pivka used to break off ice blocks and store them until spring, then transport them on horse-pulled carts to Trieste where it was used in butcher shops, fisheries and restaurants before the onset of electric cooling. Women would pick herbs for herbal remedies, mostly juniper berries, ribwort plantain, yarrow, thyme, and others. Branches of willows that grow around the lake were used for basket weaving.

Abandoned military facilities in vicinity bear witness to military use of this area. The broader area of the Pivka Lakes was used as a military training ground first by the Austro-Hungarian army, and later by the Italian and Yugoslav armed forces. During military exercises, local inhabitants were compensated for their inability to use it. The area has not been used for military purposes since 1991, and the damage to the bed of Lake Palčje has been repaired.

Today, the lake and its surroundings form part of the Natura 2000 network. Cutting hay continues until this day and development is directed towards ecotourism and sustainable agriculture.
