= Snežnik (plateau) =

Mountain plateau in Slovenia

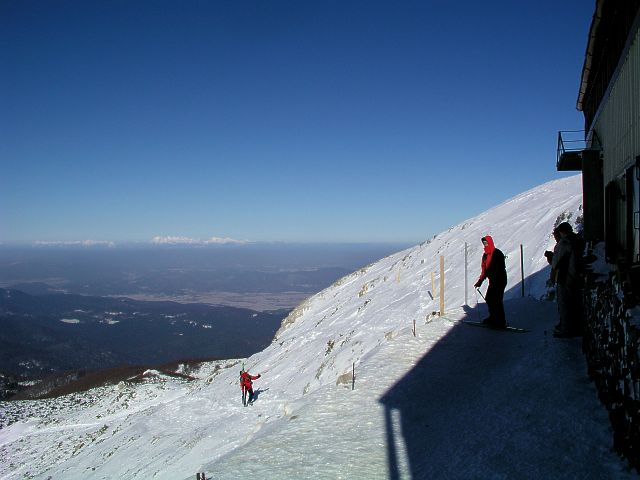
- View from Big Mount Snežnik (Veliki Snežnik). To the right, the Drago Karolin Lodge.

Highest point
- Elevation: 1,796 m (5,892 ft)
- Prominence: 1,122 m (3,681 ft)
- Isolation: 79.29 km (49.27 mi)
- Coordinates: 45°34′53.45″N 14°25′53.55″E

Geography
- Location within Slovenia
- Location: Inner Carniola, Slovenia
- Parent range: Dinaric Alps

Geology
- Rock type: Sedimentary

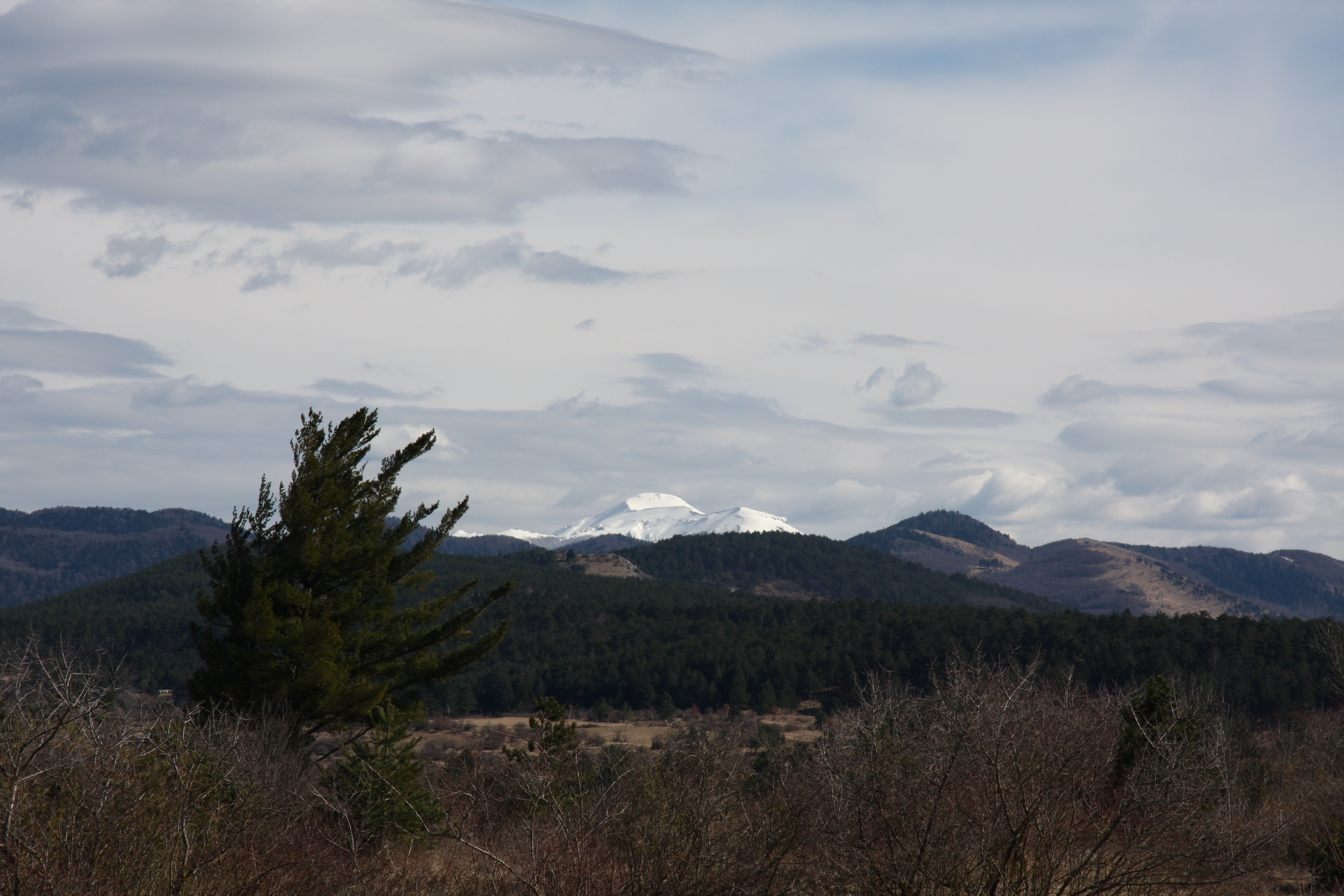
Snežnik from Palčje

Snežnik (pronounced [snɛˈʒniːk]; Slovene: Snežnik, Croatian: Snježnik, Latin: Mons Albus, Italian: Monte Nevoso, German: Krainer Schneeberg) is a wide karst limestone plateau with an area of about 85 km^{2} (33 sq mi) in the Dinaric Alps. It can also be viewed as a southern extension of the Julian Alps. The main part of the plateau is in Slovenia, while the southern part extends into Croatia and connects to the mountain region of Gorski Kotar.

== Geology and climate ==
It mainly consists of Cretaceous limestone, with Jurassic limestone and a small amount of dolomite at the top. The surface was transformed by ice in the last glacial period. It is generally level, but has numerous dry valleys, sinkholes, about 300 caves and shafts, and cold-air pools with temperatures reaching −32 °C (−26 °F) in the coldest part of year. The surface is mainly stony, covered with patchy and shallow soil, except for the larger depressions. Because the plateau is only 28 km (17 mi) from the Adriatic Sea, it has up to 3,000 millimetres (120 in) of precipitation per year. It is covered by snow in winter. Due to the karst nature of the plateau, there are no surface streams.

The plateau has the following two main peaks:

- Big Mount Snežnik (Veliki Snežnik), 1,796 m (5,892 ft), Slovenia
- Little Mount Snežnik (Mali Snežnik), 1,688 m (5,538 ft), Slovenia

Note that on the Croatian side of the border, 20 km to the south in the Risnjak National Park of Gorski Kotar, there is a mountain also called Snježnik or Snežnik with an altitude of 1,506 m (4,941 ft)

== Biology ==
The vegetation of Snežnik was first studied in the 19th century by Heinrich Freyer, who was later the curator of the Estate Museum of Carniola in Ljubljana. It is Central European, with a large contribution of Southern European species and montane flora above the timberline. In sinkholes, vegetation inversion and a lower timberline (otherwise rare in Slovenia) may be observed. The plateau is covered by beech and fir forests, except for the highest parts covered by dwarf pine and grass. The area of Snežnik above 1,450 m (4,760 ft) covers 196 hectares (480 acres) and was protected in 1964 as a natural landmark. It is a habitat for Edraianthus graminifolius, Arabis scopoliana, Campanula justiniana, Nigritella rubra, Gentiana clusii, Gentiana pannonica, and other flowers. The animals living there include brown bears, wolves, deer, wild boars, and lynx, as well as a number of bird species such as the Ural owl, corn crake, western capercaillie, hazel grouse, and golden eagle.

== Hiking ==
Big Mount Snežnik is the highest non-Alpine peak of Slovenia and the highest peak along the National Liberation War Courier and Signal Operator Trail (Slovene: Pot kurirjev in vezistov NOV Slovenije). It may be seen from many other parts of Slovenia and is a popular hiking destination. It offers an extensive view and has a toposcope. It is most easily accessible from Sviščaki, a hamlet of the dispersed settlement of Snežnik, on the plateau.

The Drago Karolin Lodge (Koča Draga Karolina) is located just below the peak of Big Mount Snežnik towards the border with Croatia. It was first built as a shelter under the leadership of the professor and mountaineer Drago Karolin, the president of the Snežnik Ilirska Bistrica Mountaineering Club. It was expanded from 1977 to 1994 and named after its first builder.

== In popular culture ==
In The Glory of the Duchy of Carniola, published in 1689, the polymath Johann Weikhard von Valvasor wrote the following about Snežnik:

Slivnica is considerably high. Snežnik is much higher. This mountain, the neighbour of which is the castle with the same name, is completely pointy and a true sky drill, because it raises you so much that you may wander with eyes all across the country, yes, you may cast the rays of your eye across the sea, to Italy, to Croatia, to Turkey, and everywhere around. It lies on the Croatian and Dalmatian border and harbours dreadful wilderness.
