= Tourism in Slovenia =

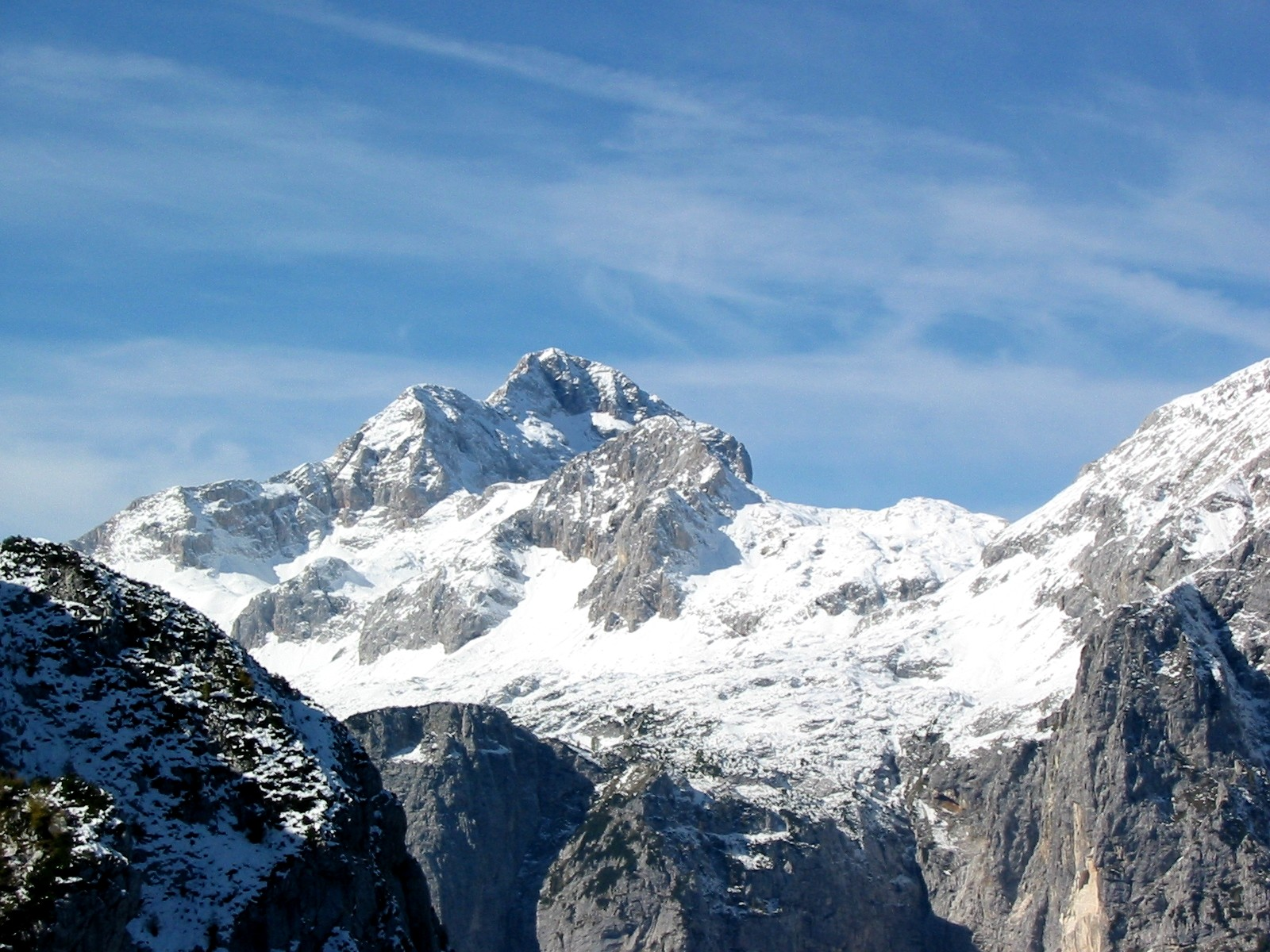
Triglav, the highest peak

Lake Bled

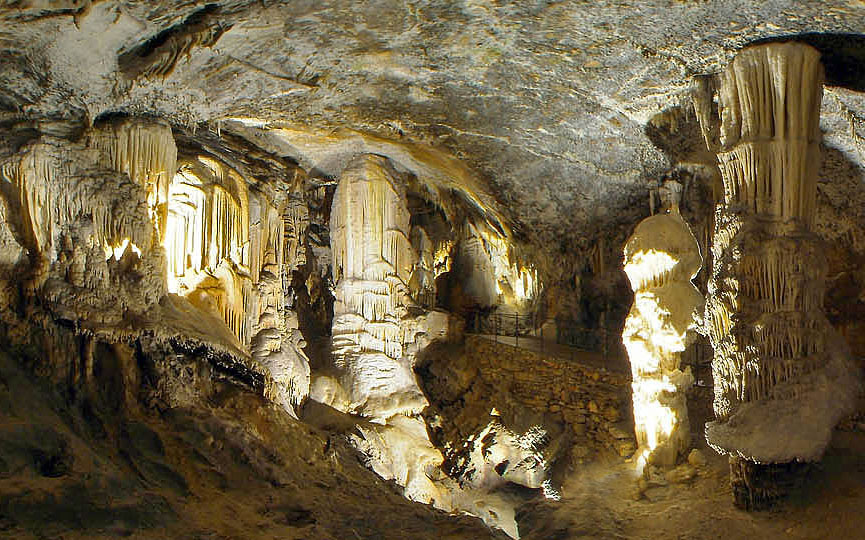
Postojna Cave

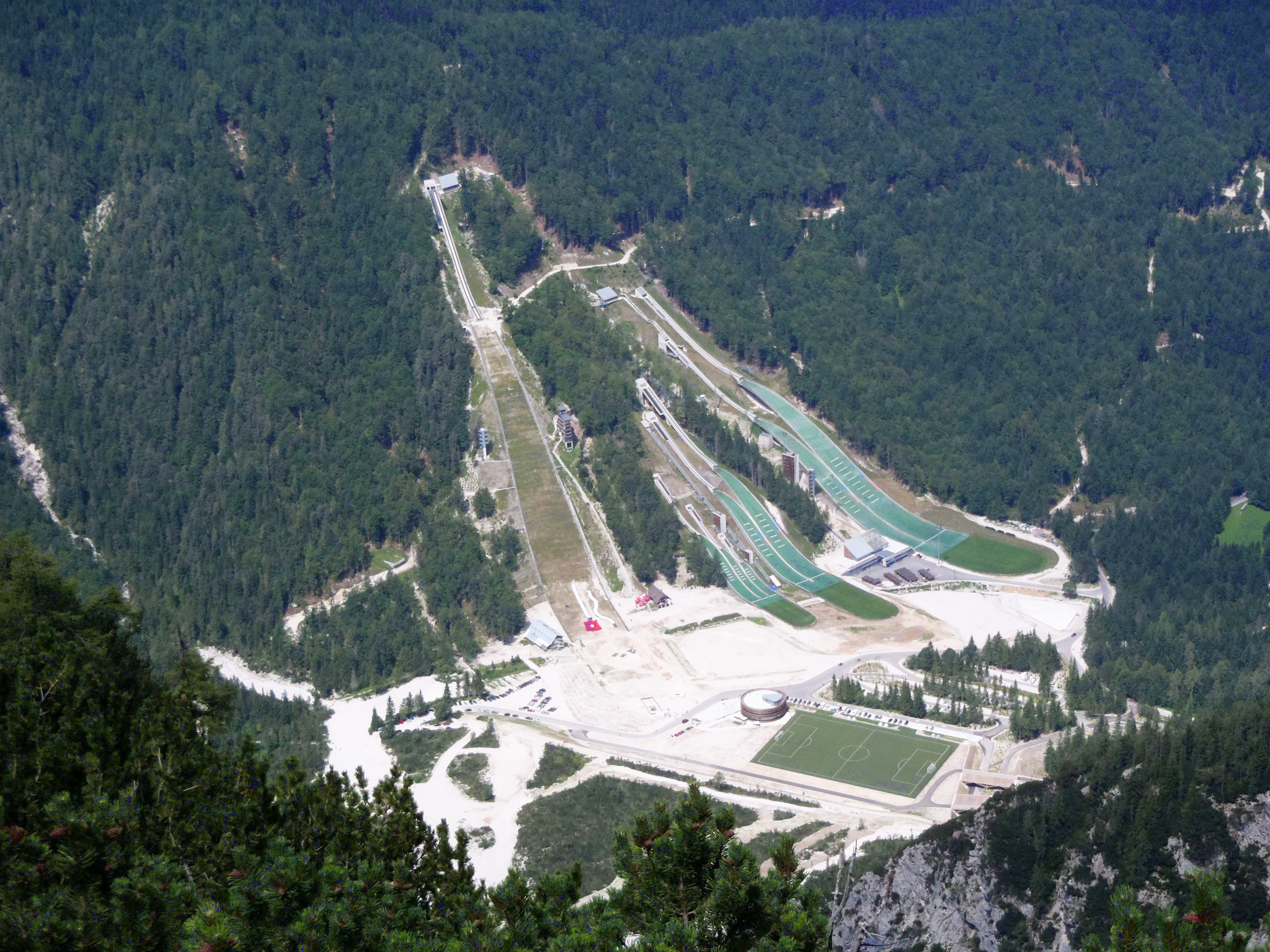
Planica

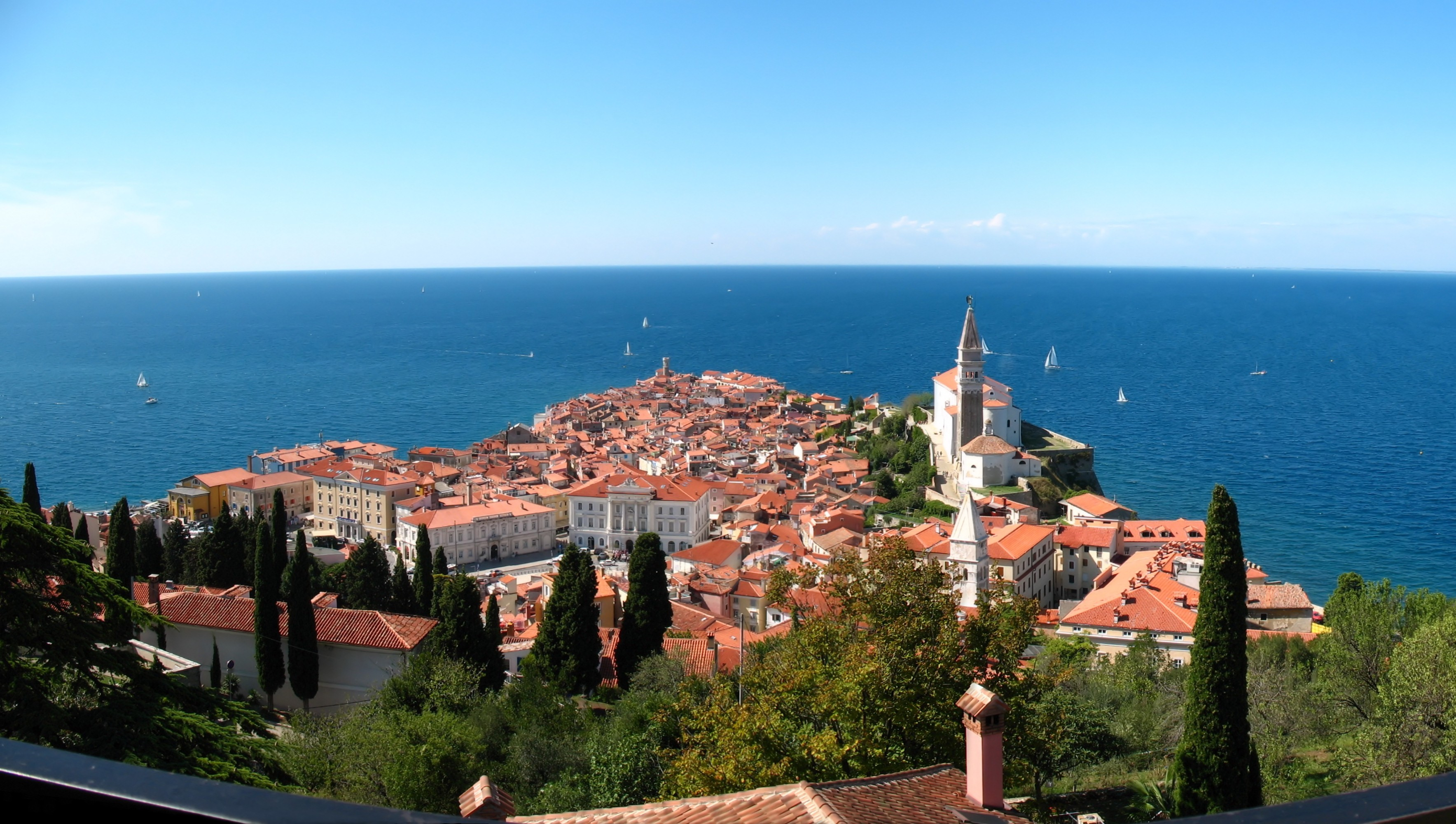
Piran, a coast town

Slovenia offers tourists a wide variety of landscapes: Alpine in the northwest, Mediterranean in the southwest, Pannonian in the northeast, and Dinaric in the southeast. They roughly correspond to the traditional regions of Slovenia, based on the former four Habsburg crown lands (Carniola, Carinthia, Styria, and the Littoral). Each offers its own natural, geographic, architectural, and cultural features. Slovenia has mountains, meadows, lakes, caves, and the sea, making it an attractive destination in Europe.

The nation's capital, Ljubljana, has many important Baroque and Art Nouveau buildings, with several important works of the native born architect Jože Plečnik. Other attractions include the Julian Alps with picturesque Lake Bled and the Soča Valley, as well as the nation's highest peak, Mount Triglav. Perhaps even better known is the Karst Plateau in the Slovenian Littoral. More than 28 million visitors have visited Postojna Cave, while a 15-minute ride from it are Škocjan Caves, a UNESCO World Heritage Site. Several other caves are open to public, including Vilenica Cave.

Further in the same direction is the Adriatic coast, where the most important historical monument is the Venetian Gothic Mediterranean town of Piran. The neighboring town of Portorož is a popular modern tourist resort, offering entertainment in gambling tourism. The former fishermen town of Izola has also been transformed into a popular tourist destination; many tourists also appreciate the old Medieval center of the port of Koper, which is however less popular among tourists than the other two Slovenian coastal towns.

Styria is known for its white wine, especially the Ljutomer Riesling, after the ski resort Pohorje, after summer cultural festivals in Maribor, and after pumpkin seed oil. It is also known as a hop growing area producing Styrian Goldings, a variety of the English aroma hop Fuggles.

The northeastern Prekmurje region is known for its distinctive cuisine. Among traditional dishes, the best known are a pork, turnip and millet casserole called bujta repa and a layered pastry called prekmurska gibanica. An important spa town in the region is Moravske Toplice, which is attracting many German, Austrian, Italian and Russian visitors.

Rural tourism is important throughout the country, and it is especially developed in the Karst Plateau region, parts of Inner Carniola, Lower Carniola and northern Istria, and in the area around Podčetrtek and Kozje in eastern Styria. Horse-riding, cycling and hiking are among the most important tourist activities in these areas.

Triglav National Park (Slovene: Triglavski narodni park) is a national park located in Slovenia. It was named after Mount Triglav, a national symbol of Slovenia. Triglav is situated almost in the middle of the national park. From it the valleys spread out radially, supplying water to two large river systems having their sources in the Julian Alps: the Soča and the Sava, flowing to the Adriatic and Black Sea, respectively.

The proposal for conservation dates back to the year 1908, and was realised in 1924. Then, on the initiative taken by the Nature Protection Section of the Slovene Museum Society together with the Slovene Mountaineering Society, a twenty-year lease was taken out on the Triglav Lakes Valley area, some 14 km². It was destined to become an Alpine Protection Park, however permanent conservation was not possible at that time. In 1961, after many years of effort, the protection was renewed (this time on a permanent basis) and somewhat enlarged, embracing around 20 km². The protected area was officially designated as Triglav National Park. Under this act, however, all objectives of a true national park were not attained and for this reason over the next two decades, new proposals for the extension and rearrangement of the protection were put forward. Finally, in 1981, a rearrangement was achieved and the park was given a new concept and enlarged to 838 km² – the area it continues to cover to this day.

The Karawank mountain range and the Kamnik Alps are also important tourist destinations, as are the Pohorje mountains. Unlike the Julian Alps, however, these areas seem to attract mostly Slovene visitors and visitor from the neighboring regions of Austria, and remain largely unknown to tourists from other countries. The biggest exception is the Logar Valley, which has been promoted heavily since the 1980s.

Slovenia has a number of smaller Medieval towns, which serve as important tourist attractions. Among them, the best known are Ptuj, Škofja Loka, and Piran. Fortified villages, mostly located in western Slovenia (Štanjel, Vipavski Križ, Šmartno), have become an important tourist destination, as well, especially due to the cultural events organized in their scenic environments.

== Foreign tourists ==
=== Arrivals ===
Most foreign arrivals in Slovenia by country:

| Rank | Country | 2018 | 2019 | 2020 | Growth |
|---|---|---|---|---|---|
| 1 | Germany | 506.081 | 584.831 | 289.143 | ▼102.3% |
| 2 | Italy | 598.825 | 597.261 | 159.080 | ▼275.4% |
| 3 | Austria | 381.709 | 396.464 | 142.828 | ▼177.6% |
| 4 | Croatia | 218.896 | 234.980 | 82.062 | ▼186.3% |
| 5 | Hungary | 180.802 | 190.944 | 63.152 | ▼202.4% |
| 6 | Netherlands | 185.275 | 186.700 | 45.080 | ▼314.2% |
| 7 | Czech Republic | 160.079 | 189.802 | 44.944 | ▼322.3% |
| 8 | Serbia | 137.516 | 144.753 | 42.680 | ▼239.2% |
| 9 | France | 148.166 | 166.860 | 35.679 | ▼367.6% |
| 10 | Bosnia and Herzegovina | 66.927 | 72.049 | 34.757 | ▼107.3% |
| 11 | Poland | 125.209 | 132.566 | 26.413 | ▼401.9% |
| 12 | Slovakia | 58.886 | 64.765 | 24.196 | ▼167.7% |
| 13 | United Kingdom | 163.996 | 159.767 | 20.189 | ▼691.4% |
| 14 | Switzerland | 67.751 | 78.698 | 18.186 | ▼332.7% |
| 15 | Belgium | 107.656 | 113.872 | 17.760 | ▼541.2% |
| 16 | United States | 138.488 | 148.739 | 14.327 | ▼938.2% |
| 17 | Russia | 62.845 | 69.881 | 13.997 | ▼399.3% |
| 18 | Romania | 55.982 | 57.060 | 12.740 | ▼347.9% |
| 19 | South Korea | 145.746 | 139.429 | 10.525 | ▼1225% |
| 20 | Spain | 81.905 | 88.132 | 9.407 | ▼836.7% |

=== Overnight stays ===
Most foreign overnight stays in Slovenia by country:

| Rank | Country | 2018 | 2019 | 2020 | Growth |
|---|---|---|---|---|---|
| 1 | Germany | 1.362.214 | 1.522.057 | 813.962 | ▼87.0% |
| 2 | Austria | 1.011.153 | 1.011.682 | 373.236 | ▼171.1% |
| 3 | Italy | 1.334.059 | 1.278.454 | 364.373 | ▼250.9% |
| 4 | Croatia | 527.118 | 538.140 | 224.235 | ▼140.0% |
| 5 | Hungary | 484.913 | 496.971 | 181.859 | ▼173.3% |
| 6 | Netherlands | 612.710 | 583.274 | 155.956 | ▼274.0% |
| 7 | Serbia | 376.162 | 379.755 | 141.872 | ▼167.7% |
| 8 | Czech Republic | 431.335 | 511.754 | 129.436 | ▼295.4% |
| 9 | Bosnia and Herzegovina | 195.513 | 195.874 | 116.491 | ▼68.1% |
| 10 | France | 339.177 | 370.188 | 82.350 | ▼349.5% |
| 11 | Poland | 297.403 | 312.763 | 65.934 | ▼374.4% |
| 12 | Slovakia | 154.780 | 164.025 | 65.336 | ▼151.0% |
| 13 | United Kingdom | 470.588 | 444.333 | 61.127 | ▼626.9% |
| 14 | Russia | 298.443 | 303.280 | 59.664 | ▼408.3% |
| 15 | Belgium | 325.845 | 327.392 | 49.839 | ▼556.9% |
| 16 | Switzerland | 150.388 | 165.301 | 39.810 | ▼315.2% |
| 17 | United States | 314.861 | 323.064 | 37.414 | ▼763.5% |
| 18 | North Macedonia | 65.651 | 59.511 | 31.834 | ▼86.9% |
| 19 | Spain | 204.002 | 207.770 | 30.514 | ▼580.9% |
| 20 | Ukraine | 118.220 | 120.849 | 29.004 | ▼316.7% |

== Municipalities ==
=== Arrivals ===
Total arrivals by Slovenian municipalities.

| Rank | Municipality | 2018 | 2019 | 2020 | Growth |
|---|---|---|---|---|---|
| 1 | Piran | 604.592 | 620.495 | 368.510 | ▼68.4% |
| 2 | Ljubljana | 1.022.862 | 1.127.904 | 254.944 | ▼342.4% |
| 3 | Kranjska Gora | 308.193 | 325.955 | 202.705 | ▼60.8% |
| 4 | Bled | 496.677 | 509.247 | 170.084 | ▼199.4% |
| 5 | Bohinj | 248.639 | 271.692 | 157.469 | ▼72.5% |
| 6 | Bovec | 175.705 | 188.514 | 127.420 | ▼47.9% |
| 7 | Brežice | 202.780 | 202.470 | 115.953 | ▼74.6% |
| 8 | Moravske Toplice | 168.760 | 171.930 | 114.806 | ▼49.8% |
| 9 | Izola | 140.690 | 148.173 | 103.248 | ▼43.5% |
| 10 | Podčetrtek | 122.986 | 129.933 | 90.011 | ▼44.4% |
| 11 | Koper-Capodistria | 100.788 | 103.786 | 76.388 | ▼35.9% |
| 12 | Maribor | 208.279 | 217.817 | 72.380 | ▼200.9% |
| 13 | Zreče | 76.612 | 78.935 | 63.271 | ▼24.8% |
| 14 | Ankaran | 83.402 | 83.335 | 62.984 | ▼32.3% |
| 15 | Kobarid | 67.698 | 79.915 | 57.513 | ▼39.0% |
| 16 | Radovljica | 124.026 | 141.012 | 57.488 | ▼145.3% |
| 17 | Laško | 93.057 | 83.661 | 44.771 | ▼86.9% |
| 18 | Tolmin | 56.446 | 61.809 | 44.142 | ▼40.0% |
| 19 | Nova Gorica | 107.616 | 102.981 | 44.039 | ▼133.8% |
| 20 | Rogaška Slatina | 59.904 | 58.208 | 33.434 | ▼74.1% |
| 21 | Ptuj | 64.078 | 66.970 | 32.138 | ▼108.4% |
| 22 | Postojna | 105.497 | 116.330 | 26.511 | ▼338.8% |
| 23 | Sežana | 69.348 | 70.685 | 22.465 | ▼214.6% |
| 24 | Lendava | 35.059 | 39.105 | 19.396 | ▼101.6% |
| 25 | Kranj | 68.798 | 70.938 | 15.298 | ▼363.7% |

=== Overnight stays ===
Total overnight stays by Slovenian municipalities.

| Rank | Municipality | 2018 | 2019 | 2020 | Growth |
|---|---|---|---|---|---|
| 1 | Piran | 1.882.383 | 1.874.462 | 1.272.942 | ▼47.3% |
| 2 | Kranjska Gora | 828.763 | 870.949 | 613.583 | ▼41.9% |
| 3 | Ljubljana | 2.179.916 | 2.227.669 | 540.195 | ▼312.4% |
| 4 | Bohinj | 677.695 | 724.094 | 468.588 | ▼54.3% |
| 5 | Bled | 1.151.831 | 1.132.574 | 433.831 | ▼161.1% |
| 6 | Izola | 522.290 | 529.069 | 412.118 | ▼28.4% |
| 7 | Brežice | 680.003 | 686.869 | 403.066 | ▼70.4% |
| 8 | Moravske Toplice | 559.169 | 558.544 | 393.094 | ▼42.1% |
| 9 | Bovec | 462.077 | 468.798 | 364.536 | ▼28.6% |
| 10 | Podčetrtek | 391.859 | 404.916 | 293.165 | ▼38.1% |
| 11 | Ankaran | 323.355 | 318.914 | 280.883 | ▼13.5% |
| 12 | Koper | 283.217 | 293.622 | 250.601 | ▼17.2% |
| 13 | Zreče | 274.228 | 278.331 | 233.790 | ▼19.1% |
| 14 | Maribor | 466.620 | 454.004 | 196.397 | ▼131.2% |
| 15 | Radovljica | 280.103 | 317.586 | 158.805 | ▼100.0% |
| 16 | Kobarid | 186.187 | 202.297 | 158.011 | ▼28.0% |
| 17 | Laško | 289.797 | 235.187 | 139.714 | ▼68,3% |
| 18 | Rogaška Slatina | 295.474 | 298.835 | 121.120 | ▼146.7% |
| 19 | Tolmin | 157.852 | 161.160 | 119.228 | ▼35.2% |
| 20 | Dolenjske Toplice | 138.609 | 133.877 | 100.234 | ▼33.6% |
| 21 | Nova Gorica | 214.181 | 193.824 | 91.627 | ▼111.5% |
| 22 | Ptuj | 146.677 | 156.668 | 90.845 | ▼72.5% |
| 23 | Lendava | 124.081 | 132.294 | 66.134 | ▼100.0% |
| 24 | Postojna | 164.425 | 165.298 | 45.078 | ▼266.7% |
| 25 | Kranj | 128.510 | 121.367 | 39.099 | ▼210.4% |

== By years ==
=== Total arrivals ===
Total arrivals by year:

| Year | Foreign | Domestic | Total | Growth |
|---|---|---|---|---|
| 2015 | 3.022.018 | 1.351.860 | 4.373.878 | ▲12.1% |
| 2016 | 3.396.873 | 1.437.198 | 4.834.071 | ▲10.5% |
| 2017 | 3.990.682 | 1.512.602 | 5.503.284 | ▲13.8% |
| 2018 | 4.425.139 | 1.508.128 | 5.933.266 | ▲7.8% |
| 2019 | 4.701.878 | 1.527.695 | 6.229.573 | ▲4.94% |
| 2020 | 1.216.114 | 1.848.971 | 3.065.085 | ▼103.2% |
| 2021 | 1.832.446 | 2.171.236 | 4.003.682 | ▲30.6% |
| 2022 | 3.935.632 | 1.932.506 | 5.868.138 | ▲46.6% |

=== Total overnight stays ===
Total overnight stays by year:

| Year | Foreign | Domestic | Total | Growth |
|---|---|---|---|---|
| 2015 | 7.481.657 | 4.172.197 | 11.653.764 | ▲8.5% |
| 2016 | 8.339.978 | 4.307.898 | 12.647.876 | ▲8.5% |
| 2017 | 9.685.329 | 4.523.216 | 14.208.545 | ▲12.3% |
| 2018 | 11.176.010 | 4.518.695 | 15.694.705 | ▲10.5% |
| 2019 | 11.370.766 | 4.404.565 | 15.775.331 | ▲0,51% |
| 2020 | 3.354.365 | 5.850.018 | 9.204.374 | ▼71.4% |
| 2021 | 4.794.472 | 6.456.686 | 11.251.158 | ▲22.2% |
| 2022 | 10.075.084 | 5.506.772 | 15.581.856 | ▲38.5% |
