= Prestranek =

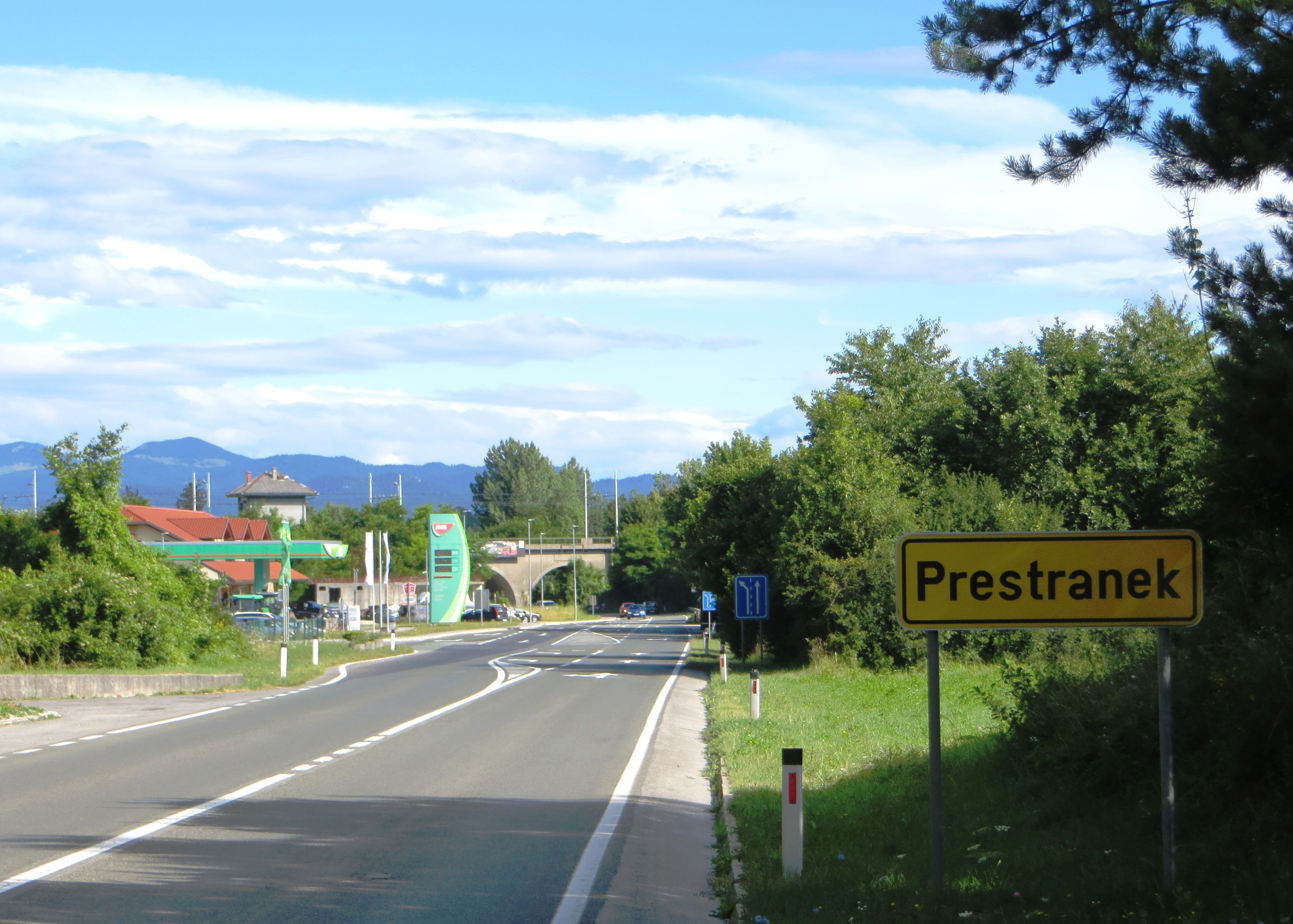

- Location in Slovenia
- Coordinates: 45°43′50.64″N 14°10′57.94″E
- Country: Slovenia
- Traditional region: Inner Carniola
- Statistical region: Littoral–Inner Carniola
- Municipality: Postojna

Area
  - Total: 3.88 km^{2} (1.50 sq mi)
- Elevation: 545 m (1,788 ft)

Population (2002)
  - Total: 724

Prestranek (pronounced [pɾɛˈstɾaːnək]; German: Pröstranegg, Italian: Prestrane) is a settlement south of Postojna in the Inner Carniola region of Slovenia.

== Prestranek Castle ==
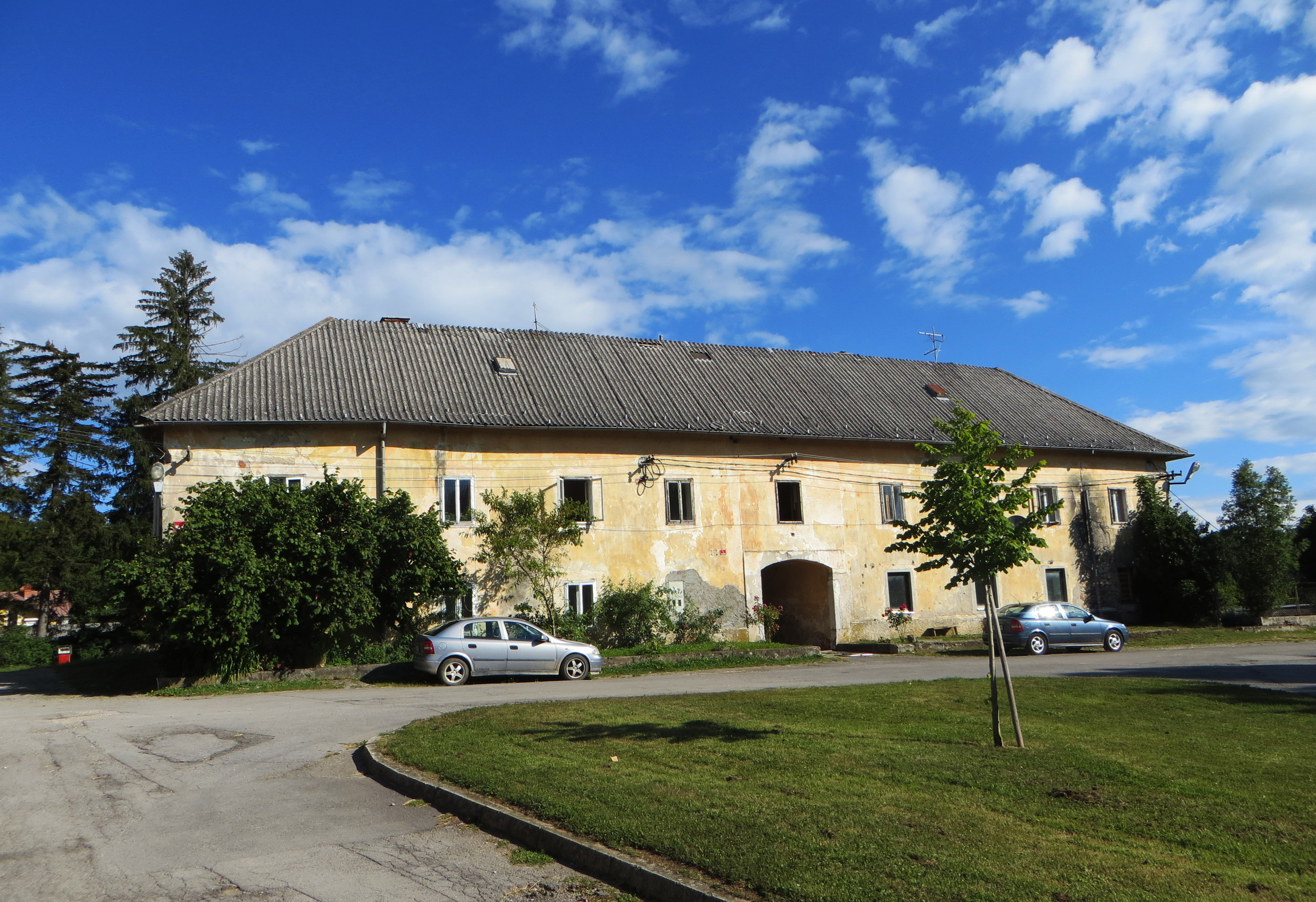
Prestranek Castle

Prestranek is the location of Prestranek Castle, also known as the Edling Manor (Slovene: Edlingov dvorec), an estate first mentioned in written sources in 1581. In 1728 it was bought by Emperor Charles VI and managed together with the Lipica Stud Farm. It operated as a royal farm until the First World War, when it was taken over by the army. After the Second World War it was again revived as part of the Lipica Estate. In the 1990s it was privatized, and it now operates as an equestrian centre.
