= Javornik Hills =

Limestone plateau in Slovenia and part of the Dinaric Alps

Coordinates: 45°44′N 14°17′E

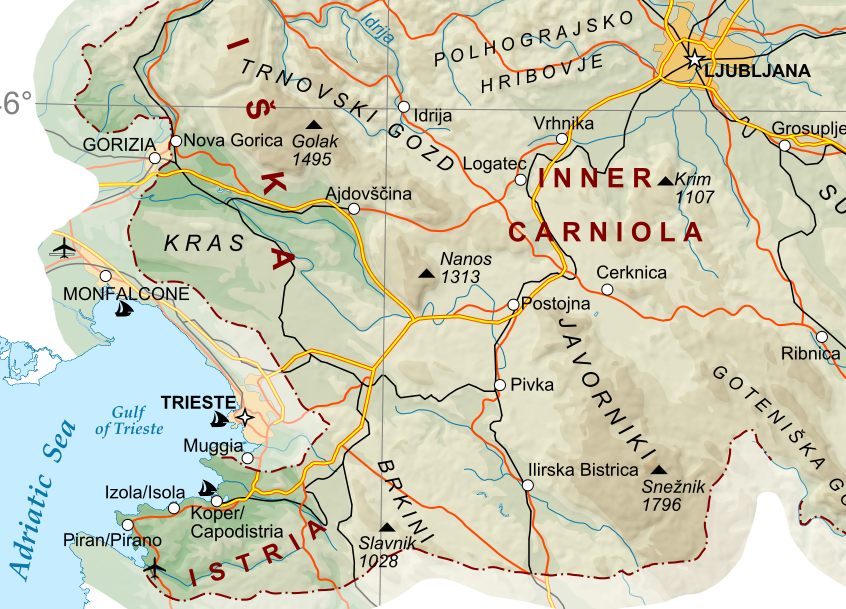
The Javornik Hills are a limestone plateau in Slovenia

There is also a Javorníky mountain range in the Carpathian Mountains

The Javornik Hills (Slovene: Javorniki) are a limestone plateau in Slovenia and part of the Dinaric Alps. The highest peak is Veliki Javornik at 1,268 metres (4,160 ft) above sea level. At the northern edge of the Javornik Hills lies the Postojna Gate.

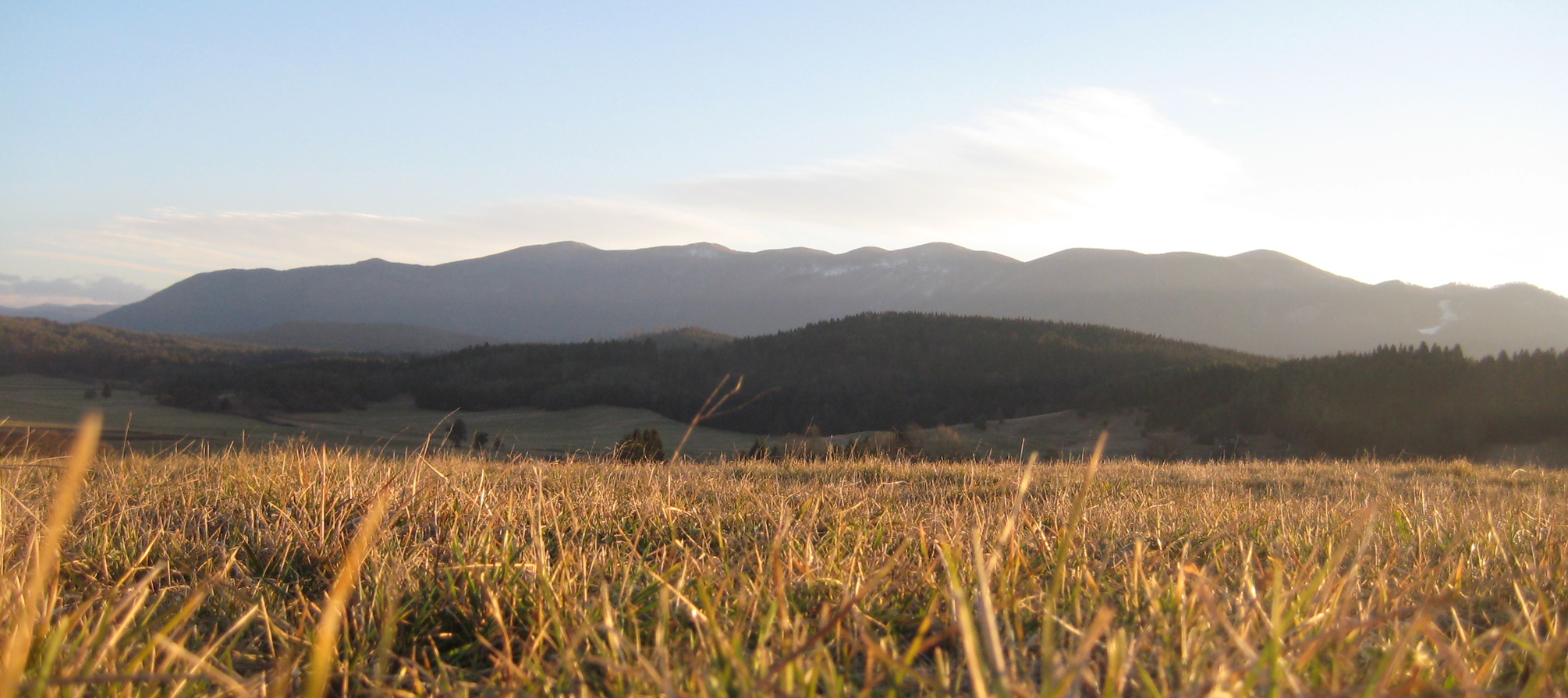
