= Čepno =

- Location in Slovenia
- Coordinates: 45°40′14.88″N 14°5′47.53″E
- Country: Slovenia
- Traditional region: Inner Carniola
- Statistical region: Littoral–Inner Carniola
- Municipality: Pivka

Area
  - Total: 2.25 km^{2} (0.87 sq mi)
- Elevation: 564.8 m (1,853 ft)

Population (2002)
  - Total: 40

Čepno (pronounced [ˈtʃɛːpnɔ]) is a small village northwest of Gornja Košana in the Municipality of Pivka in the Inner Carniola region of Slovenia.

The local church, a small building on a hill above the settlement, is dedicated to the Holy Trinity and belongs to the Parish of Košana.
