= Narin, Pivka =

Narin
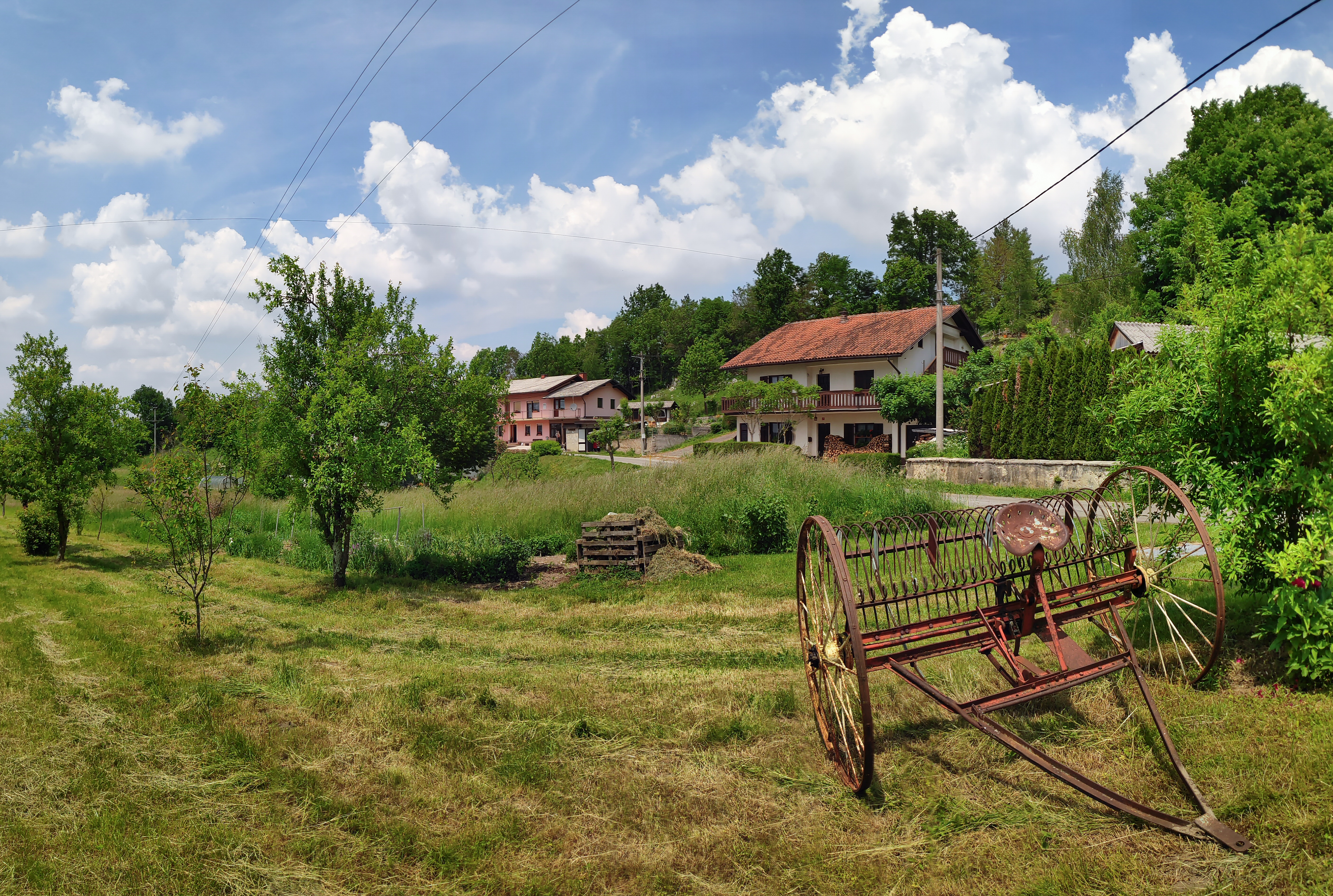

- Location in Slovenia
- Coordinates: 45°38′37.41″N 14°11′39.17″E
- Country: Slovenia
- Traditional region: Inner Carniola
- Statistical region: Littoral–Inner Carniola
- Municipality: Pivka

Area
  - Total: 6.56 km^{2} (2.53 sq mi)
- Elevation: 478.1 m (1,569 ft)

Population (2002)
  - Total: 220

Narin (pronounced [naˈɾiːn], German: Narein) is a village south of Pivka in the Inner Carniola region of Slovenia.

The local church, built northwest of the settlement, is dedicated to Saint James and belongs to the Parish of Šmihel.
