= Kal, Pivka =

Kal
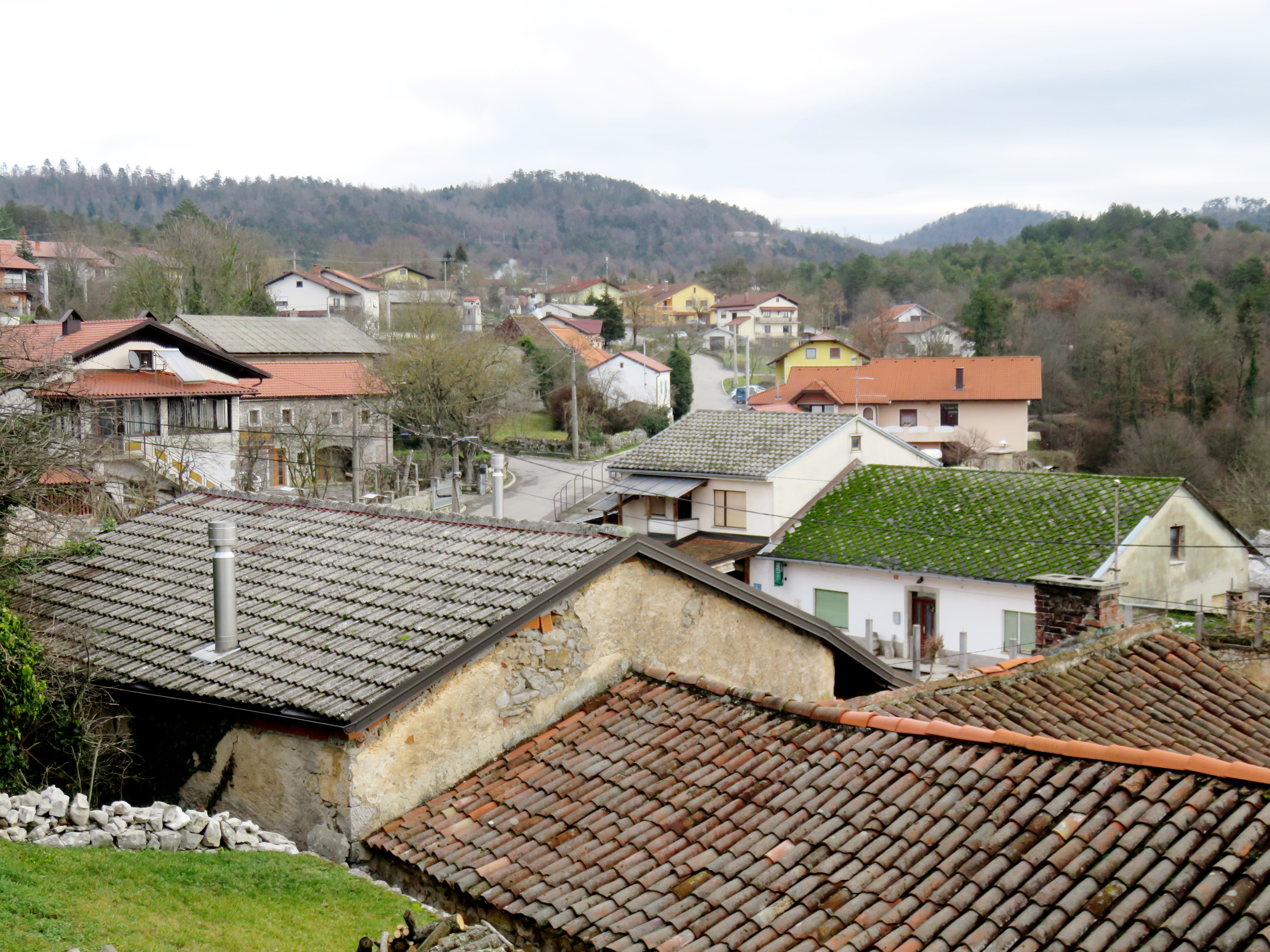

- Location in Slovenia
- Coordinates: 45°40′9.3″N 14°9′53.43″E
- Country: Slovenia
- Traditional region: Inner Carniola
- Statistical region: Littoral–Inner Carniola
- Municipality: Pivka

Area
  - Total: 7.35 km^{2} (2.84 sq mi)
- Elevation: 479.7 m (1,574 ft)

Population (2002)
  - Total: 313

Kal (pronounced [ˈkaːu̯]) is a village west of Pivka in the Inner Carniola region of Slovenia.

== Geography ==
The territory of the settlement reaches its highest elevation in the north, between the small Prevale Valley and the western slope of Kaludernik Hill (747 meters or 2,451 feet).

== Church ==
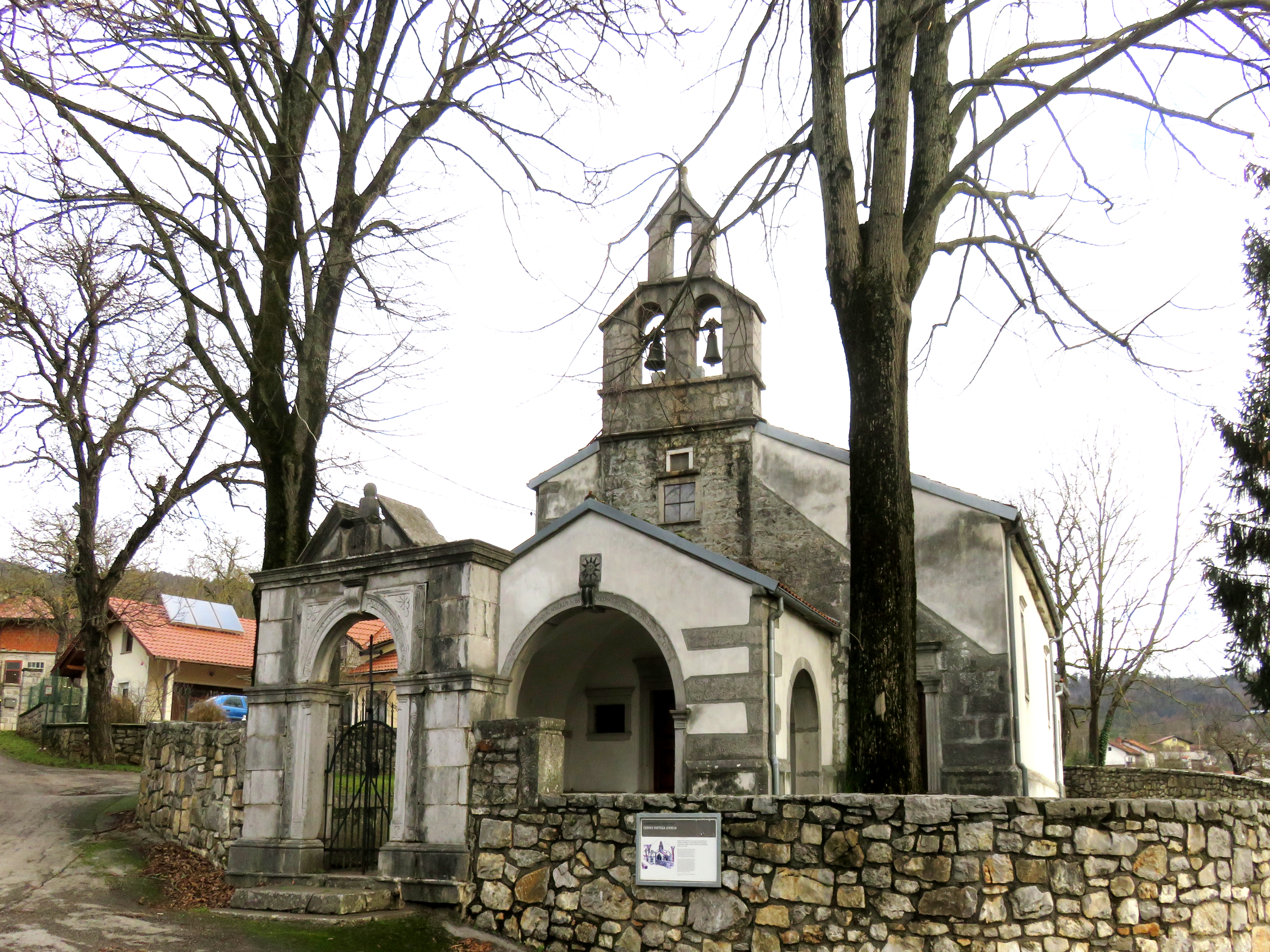
Saint Bartholomew's Church

The local church in the settlement is dedicated to Saint Bartholomew (Slovene: sveti Jernej) and belongs to the Parish of Košana.
