= Juršče =

Juršče Jurišče (until 2007)
- Location in Slovenia
- Coordinates: 45°39′56.91″N 14°17′42.56″E
- Country: Slovenia
- Traditional region: Inner Carniola
- Statistical region: Littoral–Inner Carniola
- Municipality: Pivka

Area
  - Total: 36.77 km^{2} (14.20 sq mi)
- Elevation: 706.6 m (2,318 ft)

Population (2012)
  - Total: 152

Juršče (pronounced [ˈjuːɾʃtʃɛ], formerly Jurišče, in older sources Juršiče, German: Jurschitz) is a village east of Pivka in the Inner Carniola region of Slovenia.

== Name ==
Juršče was first mentioned in written sources as Jurshiz and Jurschiz in 1763–87. The name (a feminine plural) is derived from *Jurišiči, a plural form of the patronymic *Jurišič, based on the personal name Juriša. The name Juriša is derived from Jurij 'George', which also coincidentally matches the patron saint of the village church. However, there is no direct connection between the village name and the church name. The village was officially named Jurišče until 2007, when the name was changed to Juršče.

== Church ==
The local church is dedicated to Saint George (Slovene: sveti Jurij) and belongs to the Parish of Trnje.
