= Klenik, Pivka =

Klenik
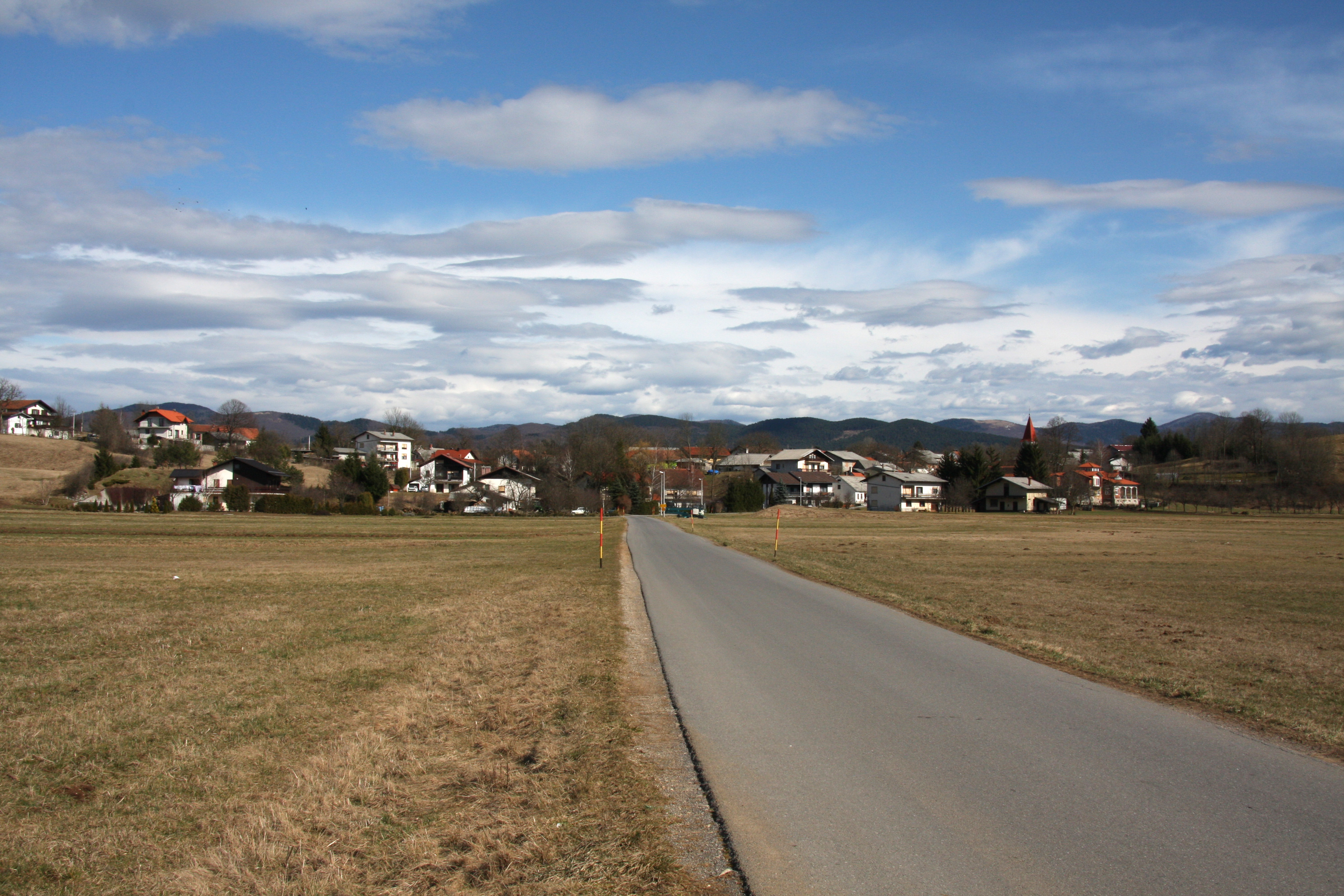

- Location in Slovenia
- Coordinates: 45°40′43.42″N 14°13′11.64″E
- Country: Slovenia
- Traditional region: Inner Carniola
- Statistical region: Littoral–Inner Carniola
- Municipality: Pivka

Area
  - Total: 3.34 km^{2} (1.29 sq mi)
- Elevation: 543.6 m (1,783 ft)

Population (2002)
  - Total: 188

Klenik (pronounced [ˈkleːnik]) is a village east of Pivka in the Inner Carniola region of Slovenia.

The local church in the settlement is dedicated to Saint Leonard and belongs to the Parish of Trnje.
