= Nova Sušica =

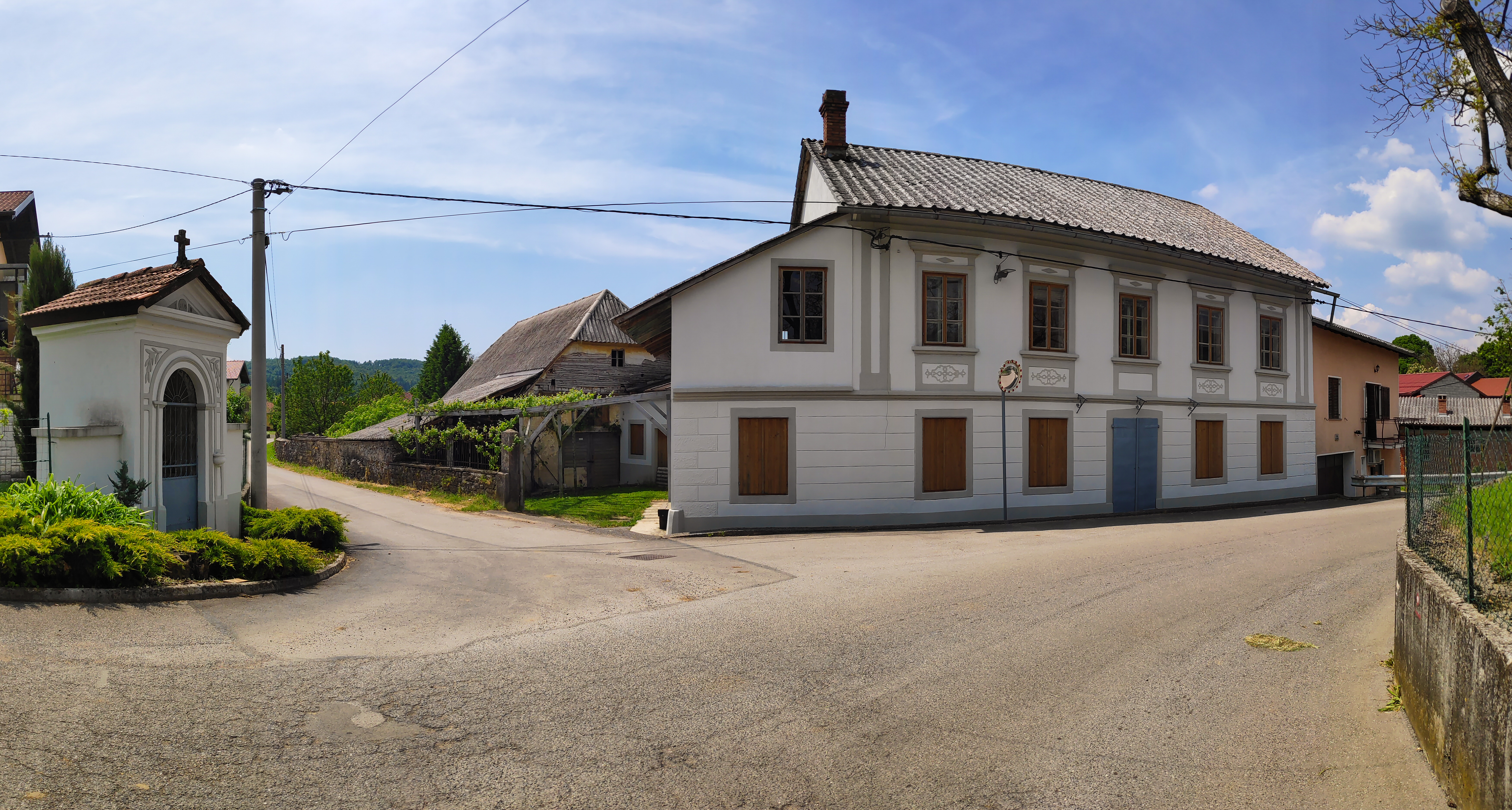

- Location in Slovenia
- Coordinates: 45°39′13.41″N 14°8′46.36″E
- Country: Slovenia
- Traditional region: Inner Carniola
- Statistical region: Littoral–Inner Carniola
- Municipality: Pivka

Area
  - Total: 2.78 km^{2} (1.07 sq mi)
- Elevation: 439 m (1,440 ft)

Population (2002)
  - Total: 101

Nova Sušica (pronounced [ˈnɔːʋa suˈʃiːtsa], German: Neudirnbach) is a village southwest of Pivka in the Inner Carniola region of Slovenia.

== Name ==
Locally, the name Nova Sušica has been reduced via syncope to Novašica.

== History ==
In 1994, territory from Nadanje Selo, Mala Pristava, Nova Sušica, and Stara Sušica was combined to create Ribnica as a separate settlement.

== Church ==
The local church in the settlement is dedicated to Saint Anne and belongs to the Parish of Košana.

== Cultural heritage ==
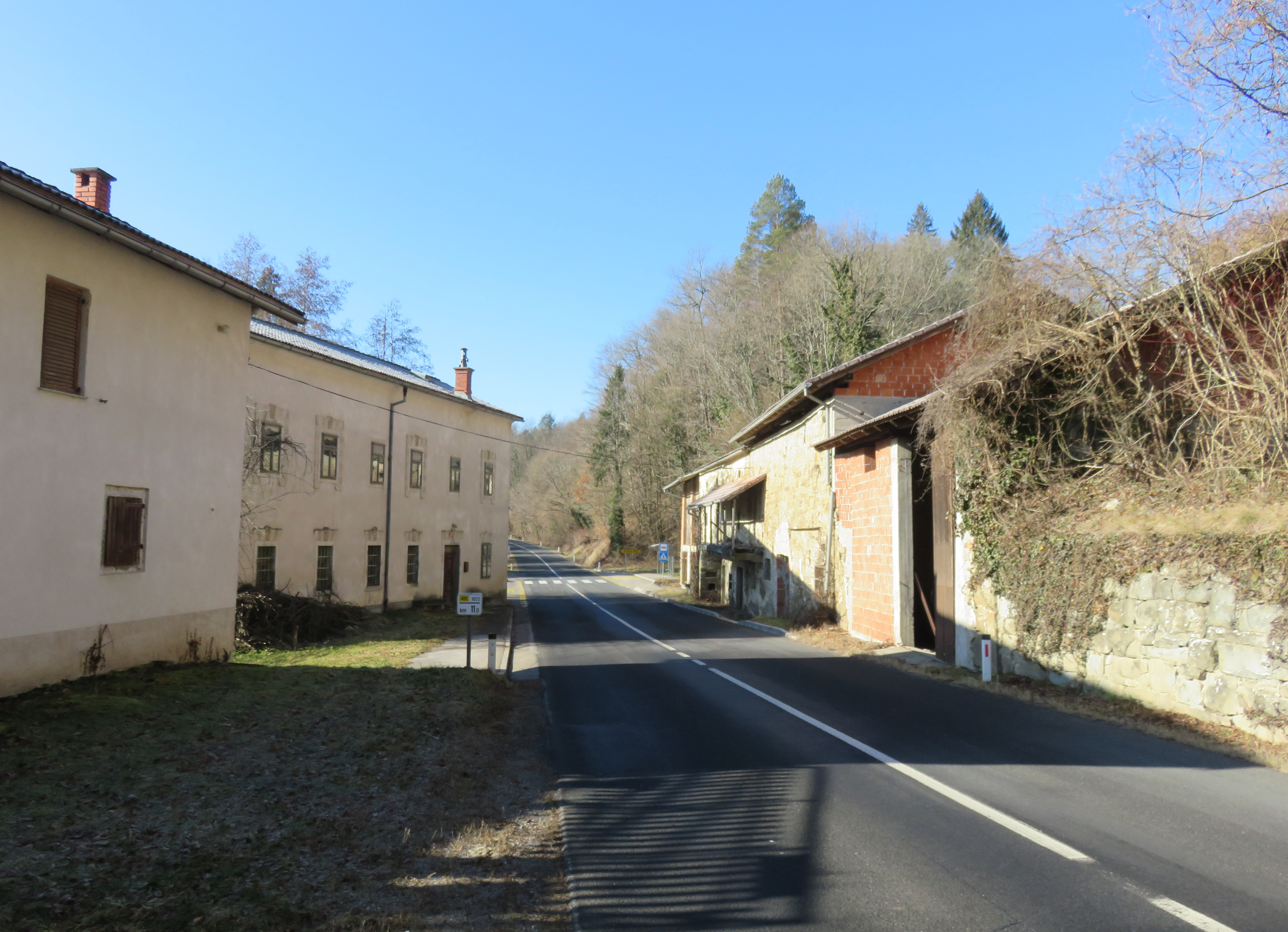
The Ambrožič Mill

The Ambrožič Mill (Slovene: Ambrožičev mlin) in Nova Sušica has been registered as technical cultural heritage. It consists of a sawmill, grain mill, and house dating from the 19th century. It is located at Nova Sušica 37 and 37a along the main road from Ribnica to Divača on the right bank of the Reka River.
