= Mala Pristava, Pivka =

Mala Pristava
- Location in Slovenia
- Coordinates: 45°38′50.15″N 14°9′37.98″E
- Country: Slovenia
- Traditional region: Inner Carniola
- Statistical region: Littoral–Inner Carniola
- Municipality: Pivka

Area
  - Total: 3.08 km^{2} (1.19 sq mi)
- Elevation: 438 m (1,437 ft)

Population (2002)
  - Total: 74

Mala Pristava (pronounced [ˈmaːla pɾiˈstaːʋa], German: Kleinmeierhof) is a village southwest of Pivka in the Inner Carniola region of Slovenia.

== History ==
Mala Pristava formerly included the hamlet of Ribnica. In 1994, territory from Nadanje Selo, Mala Pristava, Nova Sušica, and Stara Sušica was combined to create Ribnica as a separate settlement.

== Church ==
The local church in the settlement is dedicated to Our Lady of Lourdes and belongs to the Parish of Šmihel.
