= Drskovče =

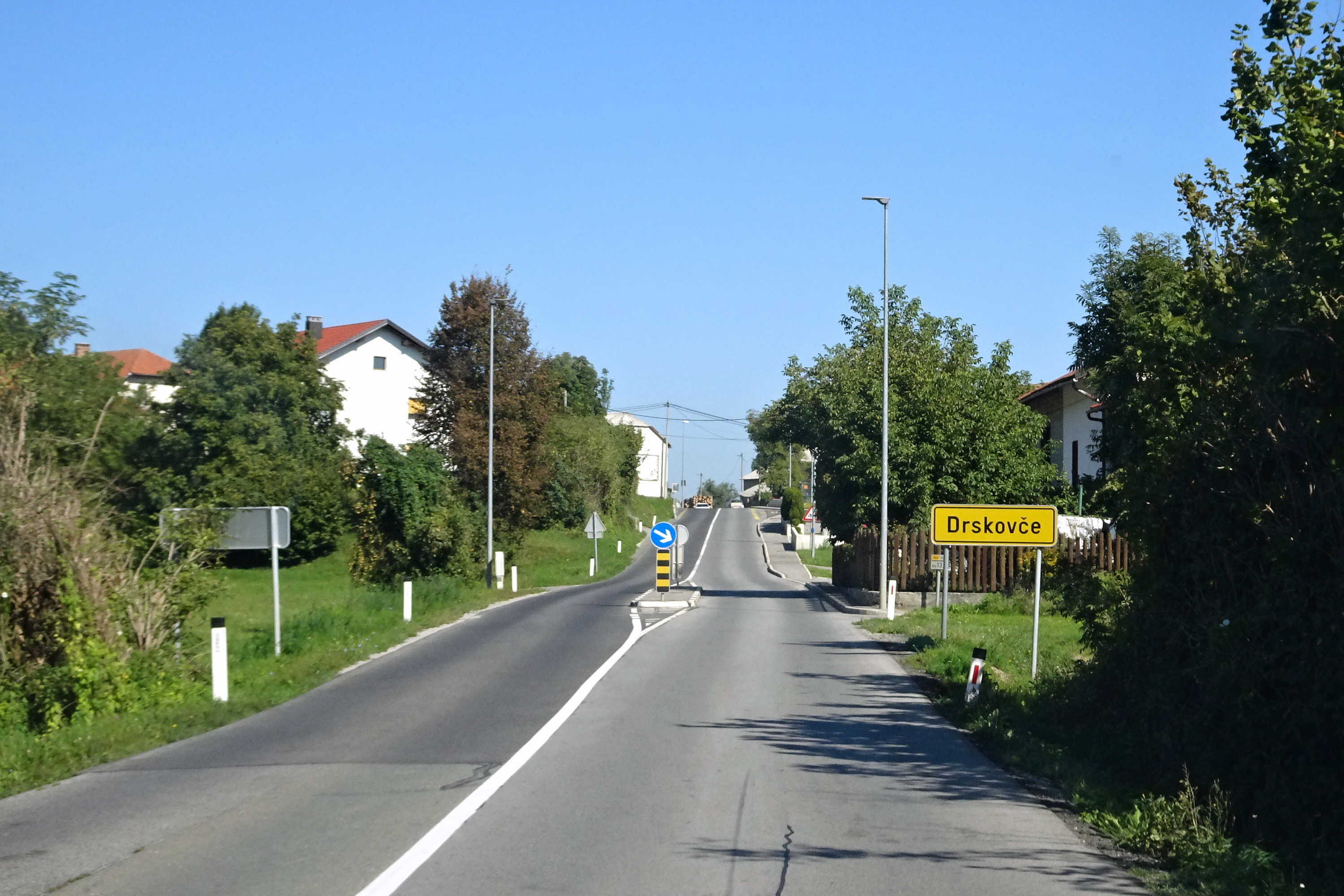

- Location in Slovenia
- Coordinates: 45°39′50.24″N 14°13′18.79″E
- Country: Slovenia
- Traditional region: Inner Carniola
- Statistical region: Littoral–Inner Carniola
- Municipality: Pivka

Area
  - Total: 2.39 km^{2} (0.92 sq mi)
- Elevation: 562.5 m (1,845 ft)

Population (2002)
  - Total: 94

Drskovče (pronounced [dəɾˈskoːu̯tʃɛ]) is a village south of Pivka in the Inner Carniola region of Slovenia.

The small church in the settlement is dedicated to Our Lady of Sorrows and belongs to the Parish of Zagorje.
