= Primož (hill) =

Location in Slovenia

- Location within Slovenia

Highest point
- Elevation: 781 m (2,562 ft)
- Prominence: 153 m (502 ft)
- Coordinates: 45°40′12.4″N 14°12′9.11″E

Naming
- Language of name: Slovene
- Pronunciation: 'pɾiːmɔʃ

Geography
- Location: Municipality of Pivka, Inner Carniola, Slovenia

Primož (pronounced ['pɾiːmɔʃ]) is a 718-meter (2,356 ft) high hill overgrown with trees, and is a part of a ridge separating the Pivka Basin from the Reka Valley. It is located in the Municipality of Pivka in the Inner Carniola region of Slovenia. It has many marked trails and a gravel road leading to its peak. There is a historical trail intended for tourists with many information signs around its peak. It served an important military role during the Second World War because it contained many tunnels and bunkers used by Italian army. It is named after Saints Primus and Felician Church, which was abandoned in the eighteenth century with practically no ruins remaining.

== Location ==
Primož Hill is located in the Municipality of Pivka in the Inner Carniola region of Slovenia. The town of Pivka is built on the northern and northeastern slopes of Primož Hill. It has a commanding view over the entire Pivka Basin, which contributed to its military importance during the Second World War.

== History ==
After the end of World War I, Primož Hill became Italian territory following an agreement between Italy, the United Kingdom, France, and Russia alongside South Tyrol, Istria, Dalmatia and various islands in the Adriatic Sea. On November 12, 1920, the border was drawn in accordance with the Treaty of Rapallo, crossing the Pivka Basin, on the ridge of the Javorniki mountain chain. Primož Hill's military tunnels were dug in 1930 as a part of the 1,850-kilometer (1,150 mi) Alpine Wall, a vast series of Italian defense fortifications. The tunnels consisted of two lines; one directly on the border, and the second one a few kilometers behind it. Locals were kept away from the tunnels, and were only allowed to bring basic materials and food near its premises. The tunnels were constructed only by verified members of the Italian National Fascist Party. The tunnels were secured with steel plates coated with a thick layer of concrete. The tunnels are 481 meters (1,578 ft) long in total, but they were never used for military purposes. After the withdrawal of Italian forces, local people took valuables from the area, and in 1944, German forces destroyed the tunnels in fear that allied Partisans would find a military use for them.

There are a number of hiking trails leading to the peak. The historical trail has information signs at the summit which explain the history of Primož Hill in detail. From its peak, most of the Pivka Basin can be seen, including Lake Palčje after heavy rainfall.

All hiking trails to the peak
Name	Starting point	Distance	Time	Increase in elevation	Difficulty	Trail markings
Krpan Trail (Krpanova pot)	Kolodvorska cesta, Pivka	1.4 km	25 min	153 m	easy	yes
Parje–Primož	Parje	2.3 km	40 min	173 m	easy	no
Pivka Park of Military History – Primož	Pivka Park of Military History, 51 Kolodvorska cesta, Pivka	2.7 km	45 min	150 m	easy	yes
