= Neverke =

- Location in Slovenia
- Coordinates: 45°39′57.55″N 14°8′14.27″E
- Country: Slovenia
- Traditional region: Inner Carniola
- Statistical region: Littoral–Inner Carniola
- Municipality: Pivka

Area
  - Total: 3.36 km^{2} (1.30 sq mi)
- Elevation: 443.2 m (1,454 ft)

Population (2002)
  - Total: 102

Neverke (pronounced [ˈneːʋɛɾkɛ]) is a village west of Pivka in the Inner Carniola region of Slovenia.

== Name ==
Neverke was attested in written sources in 1763–67 as Na Verscze, Navershze, and Versecz. The 18th-century attestations of the name indicate that they are a distorted form of the fused prepositional phrase *na Vršce 'on the small peak', whereas today's form of the name may be derived via Italian from the phrase *na Vrhe 'on the peak'. In both cases, the likely references is Vrhe Hill (477 m; 1,565 ft) immediately east of the village.

== History ==
The Italian authorities built extensive military housing in Neverke in 1933 to maintain soldiers and workers engaged in producing gunpowder and filling munitions with gunpowder. During the Second World War, after the Italian capitulation in 1943, German forces took over the site. The Germans withdrew in spring 1944, and the site was used intermittently by the sapper squad of the Partisan 9th Corps, which destroyed the rail lines between Pivka and Rijeka and between Pivka and Trieste. After the war, the buildings were eventually taken over by the Kras poultry farm, which was established in 1959.

== Church ==
The local church in the settlement is dedicated to Saint Anthony the Hermit and belongs to the Parish of Košana.
