= Gradec, Pivka =

Gradec
- Location in Slovenia
- Coordinates: 45°41′38.89″N 14°11′4.21″E
- Country: Slovenia
- Traditional region: Inner Carniola
- Statistical region: Littoral–Inner Carniola
- Municipality: Pivka

Area
  - Total: 0.59 km^{2} (0.23 sq mi)
- Elevation: 575.1 m (1,887 ft)

Population (2002)
  - Total: 52

Gradec (pronounced [ˈɡɾaːdəts], German: Graz) is a small village north of Pivka in the Inner Carniola region of Slovenia.

The local church in the settlement is dedicated to the Holy Trinity and belongs to the Parish of Pivka.
