= Petelinje, Pivka =

Petelinje
- Location in Slovenia
- Coordinates: 45°41′23.32″N 14°11′46.04″E
- Country: Slovenia
- Traditional region: Inner Carniola
- Statistical region: Littoral–Inner Carniola
- Municipality: Pivka

Area
  - Total: 2.38 km^{2} (0.92 sq mi)
- Elevation: 545 m (1,788 ft)

Population (2002)
  - Total: 281

Petelinje (pronounced [pɛtɛˈliːnjɛ]) is a settlement north of Pivka in the Inner Carniola region of Slovenia.

The local church in the settlement is dedicated to Saint Bartholomew and belongs to the Parish of Pivka.
