= Stara Sušica, Slovenia =

Stara Sušica
- Location in Slovenia
- Coordinates: 45°39′17.24″N 14°7′55.49″E
- Country: Slovenia
- Traditional region: Inner Carniola
- Statistical region: Littoral–Inner Carniola
- Municipality: Pivka

Area
  - Total: 4.18 km^{2} (1.61 sq mi)
- Elevation: 421.4 m (1,383 ft)

Population (2002)
  - Total: 60

Stara Sušica (pronounced [ˈstaːɾa suˈʃiːtsa], German: Altdirnbach) is a village southwest of Pivka in the Inner Carniola region of Slovenia.

== History ==
In 1994, territory from Nadanje Selo, Mala Pristava, Nova Sušica, and Stara Sušica was combined to create Ribnica as a separate settlement.

== Church ==
The local church in the settlement is dedicated to John the Baptist and belongs to the Parish of Košana.
