= Nadanje Selo =

- Location in Slovenia
- Coordinates: 45°38′45.39″N 14°10′36.7″E
- Country: Slovenia
- Traditional region: Inner Carniola
- Statistical region: Littoral–Inner Carniola
- Municipality: Pivka

Area
  - Total: 1.37 km^{2} (0.53 sq mi)
- Elevation: 472.9 m (1,552 ft)

Population (2002)
  - Total: 104

Nadanje Selo (pronounced [naˈdaːnjɛ ˈsɛːlɔ]) is a settlement south of Šmihel in the Municipality of Pivka in the Inner Carniola region of Slovenia.

== History ==
In 1994, territory from Nadanje Selo, Mala Pristava, Nova Sušica, and Stara Sušica was combined to create Ribnica as a separate settlement.
