= Šilentabor =

Šilentabor Tabor (nad Knežakom) (until 2000)
- Location in Slovenia
- Coordinates: 45°38′56.23″N 14°12′30.17″E
- Country: Slovenia
- Traditional region: Inner Carniola
- Statistical region: Littoral–Inner Carniola
- Municipality: Pivka

Area
  - Total: 0.95 km^{2} (0.37 sq mi)
- Elevation: 735.5 m (2,413 ft)

Population (2019)
  - Total: 13

Šilentabor (pronounced [ˈʃiːlɛntabɔɾ]; in older sources also Tabor, German: Schillertabor) is a small settlement north of Zagorje in the Municipality of Pivka in the Inner Carniola region of Slovenia. It lies on a 751 m high hill called Šilen Tabor, which is a part of Slavniški ravnik, a hill chain that separates the Pivka Basin from the Reka Valley.

== Name ==
The name of the settlement was changed from Tabor to Tabor nad Knežakom in 1955. The name was changed again to Šilentabor in 2000. The name originates from the time of Turkish invasions, when it was used as a shelter from Turkish soldiers. At that time, tabor meant 'shelter' and the word silen used to mean 'strong'. There are also some unofficial names, such as Šilentabor nad Zagorjem.

== History ==
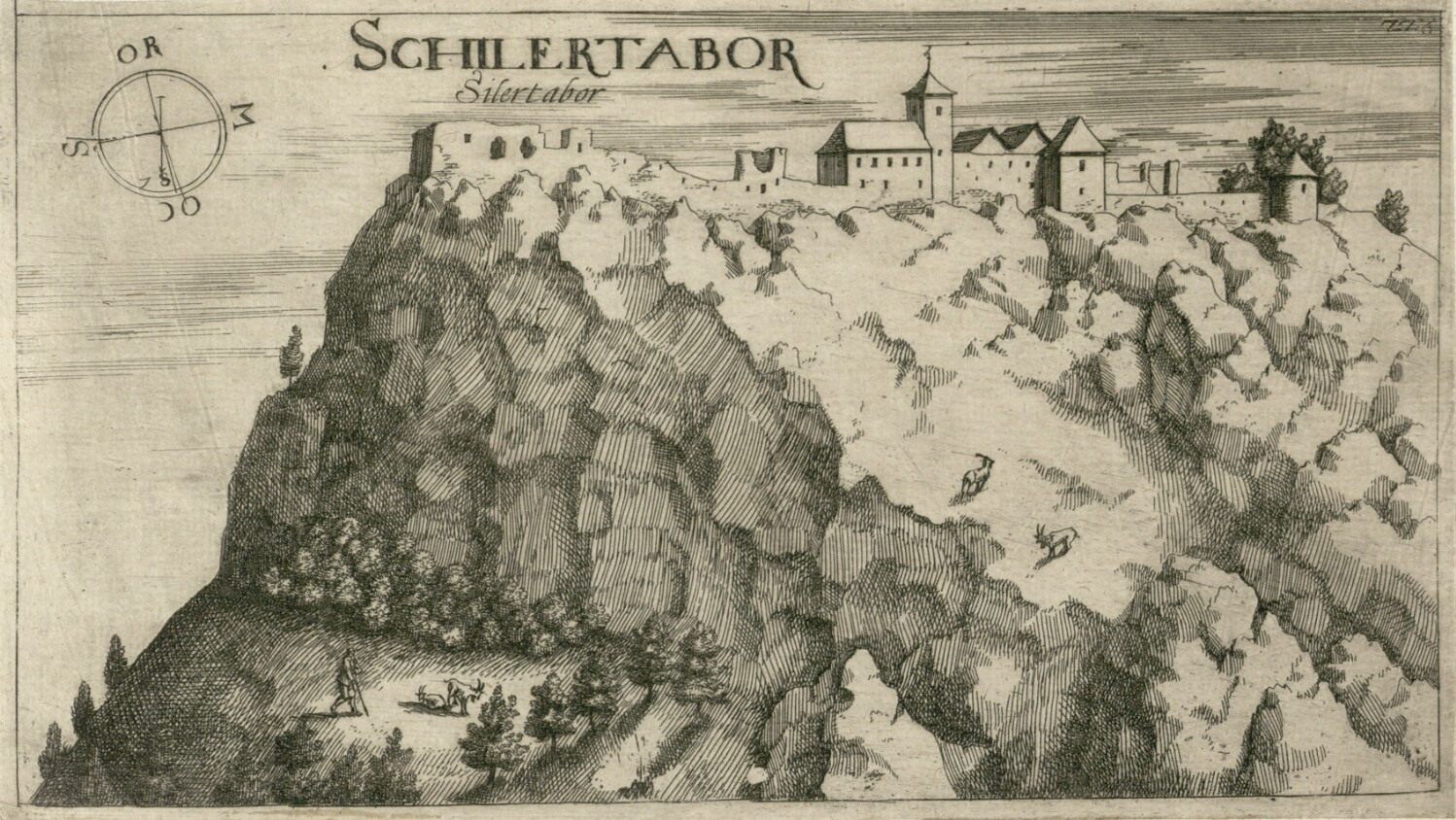
Šilentabor Castle from the seventeenth century, drawn by Johann Weikhard von Valvasor

There are some finds that show there were two hillforts from the Iron Age (around the eighth century BC) along the ridge, which were later used by the Romans: Šilentabor and Gradišče. The first one was more than 300 m in diameter. In the Middle Ages, a castle was built. One of the only records from that time mentioning Šilentabor Castle was The Glory of the Duchy of Carniola by Johann Weikhard von Valvasor. The castle was finished in 1471 and it was mostly used as a shelter from Turkish soldiers and thieves for people from the both sides of the hill. The castle was then burned down by the rebels around 1635. Then, in 1700, the castle burned down again when it was hit by a lightning and then demolished by the French in Napoleonic wars 100 years later. The end of the castle was also described by Miroslav Vilhar (1818–1871) in his work Silni Tabor. The village used to have eleven houses, but now it has only seven houses, of which four are inhabited.

=== Sinkhole pond ===
According to a story, once a castle cook threw a beehive onto the Turkish soldiers to repel them and save the castle. The people then made a pond to thank the bees.

== Castle ==
Šilentabor Castle was a 15th-century castle, of which only few ruins are visible today. Archaeological excavations have revealed the remains of a medieval defence structure and yielded numerous artifacts, confirming construction and life within the castle complex from the 15th to 17th centuries, as mentioned in historical sources. It had more than fifty granaries. A model of a castle can be found in the Pivka Park of Military History.

== Church ==
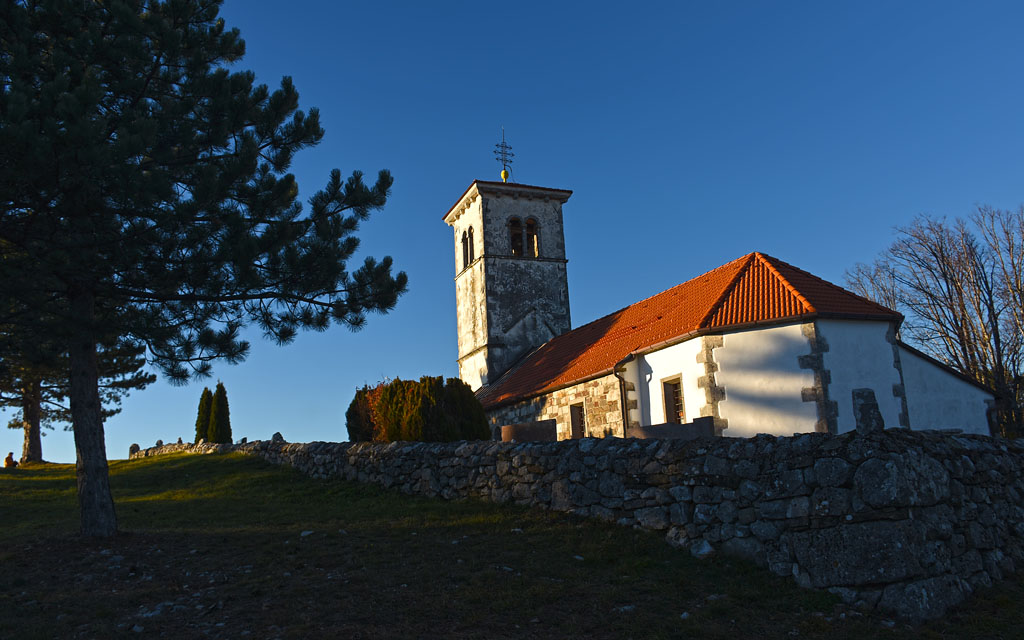
St. Martin on Šilentabor

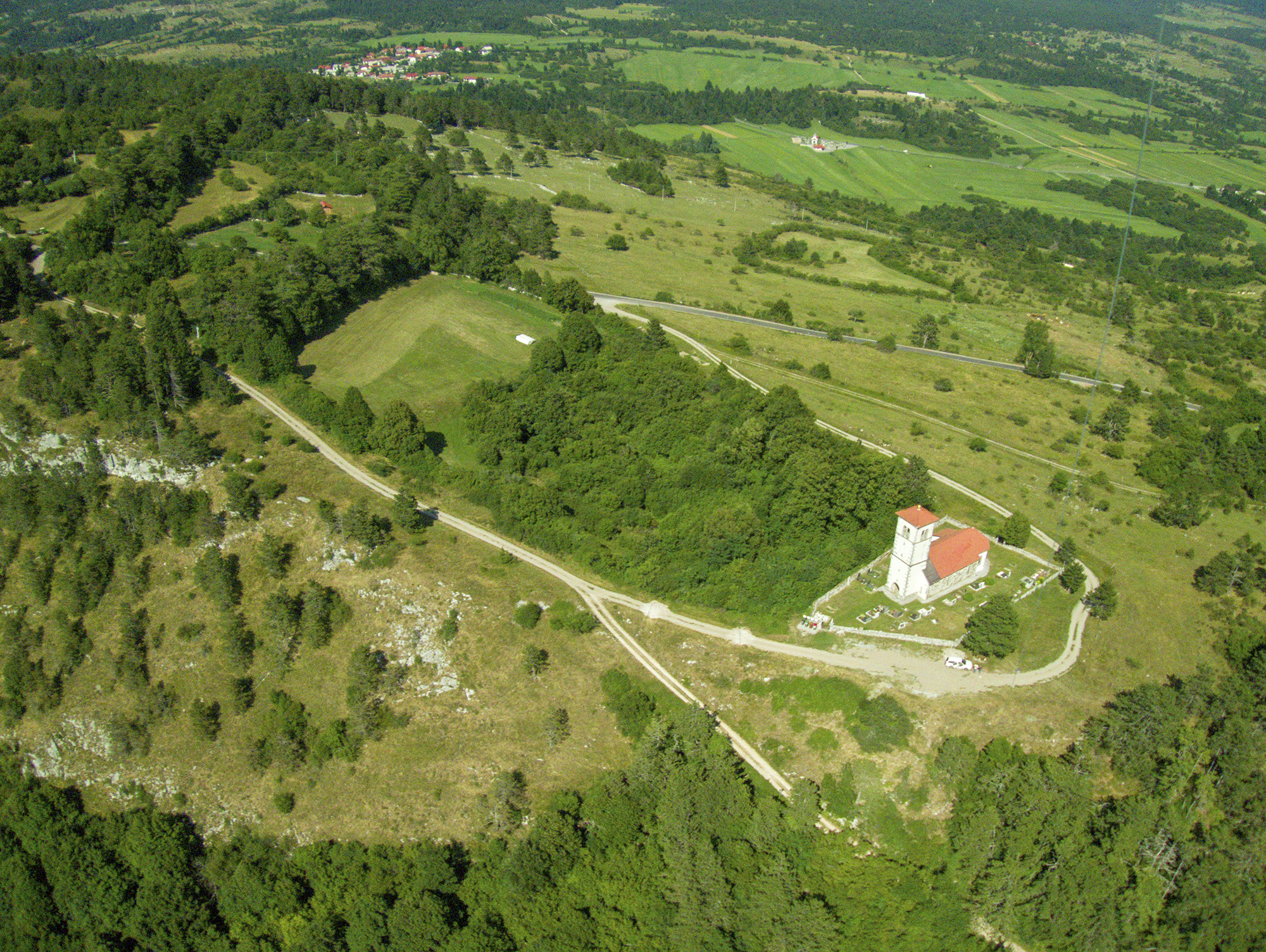
Aerial view of St. Martin's Church

The local church, built south of the settlement, is dedicated to Saint Martin and belongs to the Parish of Zagorje. It stands on its own nearby hill called St. Martin at an elevation of 723 m. It has a chancel with Gothic elements and frescoes from 1464, which are in the Istrian-Karst artistic style. During the Baroque period, it was expanded. It can be seen from the outside, but to see the inside visitors have to make prior arrangements with a local guide. The church is surrounded by a small cemetery. According to some records, there were two vaults; in one lies Bishop Andrej Jakob de Raunach, who lived in a nearby castle. Records also say it was its own parish with a monastery below it. There is still a mass every Sunday after St. Martin's Day (11 November).

== Gallery ==
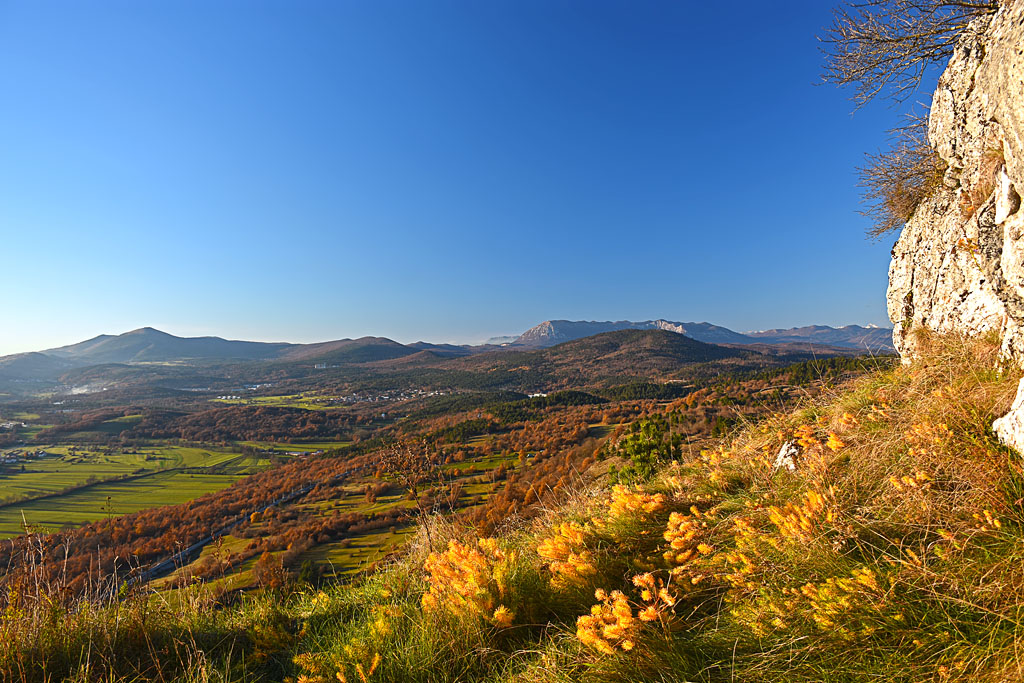
Šilentabor panorama
