= Volče, Pivka =

Volče
- Location in Slovenia
- Coordinates: 45°41′25.55″N 14°5′53.79″E
- Country: Slovenia
- Traditional region: Inner Carniola
- Statistical region: Littoral–Inner Carniola
- Municipality: Pivka

Area
  - Total: 13.54 km^{2} (5.23 sq mi)
- Elevation: 587.8 m (1,928 ft)

Population (2002)
  - Total: 59

Volče (pronounced [ˈʋoːu̯tʃɛ], in older sources Vovče, German: Woutsche) is a village in the Municipality of Pivka in the Inner Carniola region of Slovenia.

The small church in the settlement is dedicated to Saint Peter and belongs to the Parish of Košana.
