= Radohova Vas, Pivka =

Radohova Vas
- Location in Slovenia
- Coordinates: 45°40′32″N 14°12′09″E
- Country: Slovenia
- Traditional region: Inner Carniola
- Statistical region: Littoral–Inner Carniola
- Municipality: Pivka
- Elevation: 550 m (1,800 ft)

Radohova Vas (pronounced [ɾadɔˈxoʋa ˈʋaːs]; Slovene: Radohova vas, in older sources Rodohova vas, German: Rodockendorf, Italian: Rodoccova) is a formerly independent settlement in the town of Pivka in southwestern Slovenia. It is part of the traditional region of Inner Carniola and is now included with the rest of the municipality in the Littoral–Inner Carniola Statistical Region.

== Geography ==
Radohova Vas lies southeast of the center of Pivka, at the foot of Primož Hill (elevation 718 meters or 2,356 feet).

== History ==
Radohova Vas was annexed by Pivka in 1955, ending its existence as an independent settlement.

== Church ==
The church in Radohova Vas is dedicated to the Saint Lawrence. It stands on a small rise in the center of the village. Its core is a single-nave medieval church that was first mentioned in written sources in 1526 and then later reworked from 1657 to 1659. A bell tower with a tall pointed roof was built in front of the entrance in 1749 and reworked in 1876. The octagonal chancel with three bays has late Rococo (Zopfstil) arches in the Gothic tradition, and the nave has a flat ceiling.

== Notable people ==
Notable people that were born or lived in Radohova Vas include:

- Stanley Žele (1895–1966), emigration researcher and illustrator
