= Velika Pristava =

- Location in Slovenia
- Coordinates: 45°39′27.68″N 14°11′1.95″E
- Country: Slovenia
- Traditional region: Inner Carniola
- Statistical region: Littoral–Inner Carniola
- Municipality: Pivka

Area
  - Total: 3.3 km^{2} (1.3 sq mi)
- Elevation: 449 m (1,473 ft)

Population (2002)
  - Total: 51

Velika Pristava (pronounced [ˈʋeːlika pɾiˈstaːʋa], German: Großmeierhof) is a small settlement south of Pivka in the Inner Carniola region of Slovenia.
