= Kosana =

Kosana or Košana may refer to:

- George Kosana, American actor and steel worker
- Dolnja Košana, a Slovenian village
- Gornja Košana, a Slovenian village
