= Parje =

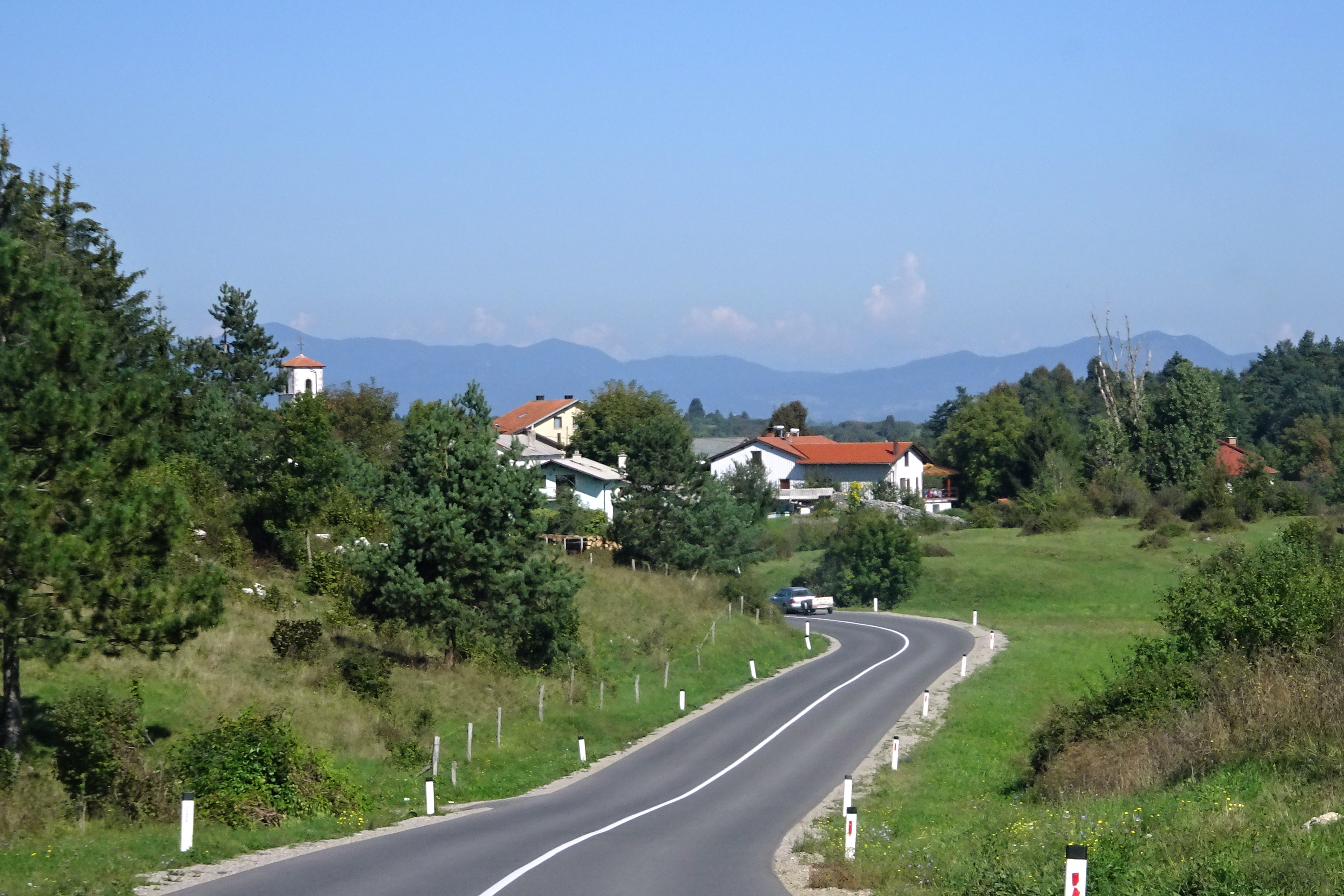

- Location in Slovenia
- Coordinates: 45°39′46.03″N 14°13′3.65″E
- Country: Slovenia
- Traditional region: Inner Carniola
- Statistical region: Littoral–Inner Carniola
- Municipality: Pivka

Area
  - Total: 3.78 km^{2} (1.46 sq mi)
- Elevation: 543.1 m (1,782 ft)

Population (2002)
  - Total: 108

Parje (pronounced [ˈpaːɾjɛ]) is a small village southeast of Pivka in the Inner Carniola region of Slovenia.

The local church in the settlement is dedicated to Saint Justus and belongs to the Parish of Zagorje.
