= Slovenska Vas, Pivka =

Slovenska Vas Slovenska vas Nemška Vas (until 1955)
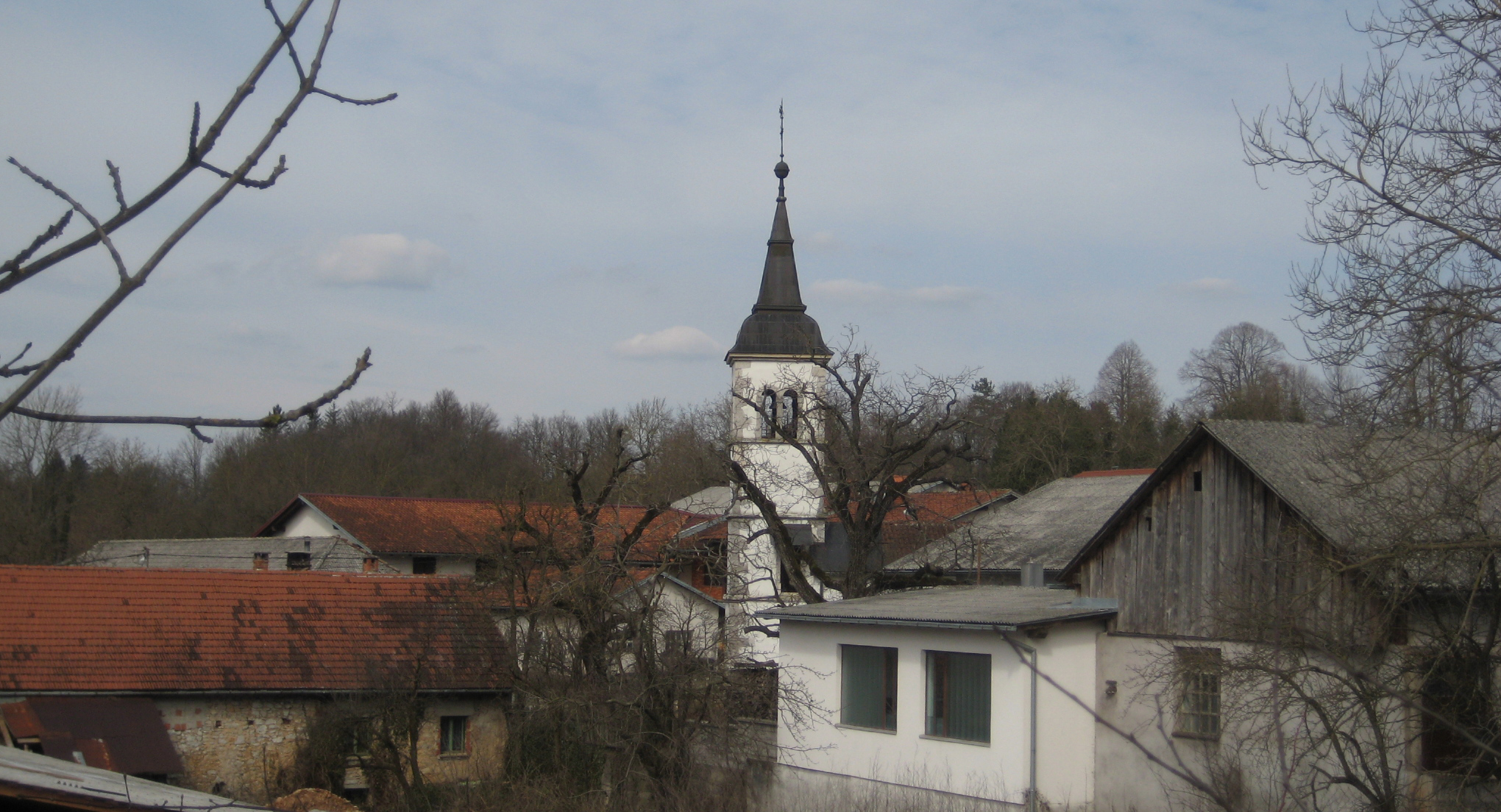

- Location in Slovenia
- Coordinates: 45°42′6.49″N 14°12′45.06″E
- Country: Slovenia
- Traditional region: Inner Carniola
- Statistical region: Littoral–Inner Carniola
- Municipality: Pivka

Area
  - Total: 4.39 km^{2} (1.69 sq mi)
- Elevation: 566.2 m (1,858 ft)

Population (2002)
  - Total: 46

Slovenska Vas (pronounced [slɔˈʋeːnska ˈʋaːs]; Slovene: Slovenska vas; previously Nemška vas, German: Deutschdorf) is a small village northeast of Pivka in the Inner Carniola region of Slovenia. Traditional agricultural activity of the village is linked to growing potatoes and oats and raising cattle, as well as some orchard and beekeeping activity.

== Name ==
The name of the settlement was changed from Nemška vas (literally, 'German village') to Slovenska vas (literally, 'Slovene village') in 1955. The name was changed on the basis of the 1948 Law on Names of Settlements and Designations of Squares, Streets, and Buildings as part of efforts by Slovenia's postwar communist government to remove German elements from toponyms. The former Slovene name and the German name Deutschdorf mean 'German village', referring to a settlement of ethnic Germans in what was otherwise Slovene ethnic territory. According to Johann Weikhard von Valvasor, the original name of the village is a reference to German and Carniolan refugees that fled here after an attack by the Venetians.

== Church ==
The local church in the settlement is dedicated to Saint Andrew and belongs to the Parish of Pivka.
