= Stara Sušica =

Stara Sušica may refer to:

- Stara Sušica, Slovenia, a village near Pivka
- Stara Sušica, Croatia, a village near Ravna Gora
