= Zalog, Postojna =

Settlement in Inner Carniola, Slovenia

Zalog
- Location in Slovenia
- Coordinates: 45°45′53″N 14°11′39″E
- Country: Slovenia
- Traditional region: Inner Carniola
- Statistical region: Littoral–Inner Carniola
- Municipality: Postojna
- Elevation: 531 m (1,742 ft)

Zalog (pronounced [ˈzaːlɔk]; German: Salog, Italian: Saloga di Postumia) is a formerly independent settlement in the town of Postojna in southwestern Slovenia. It is part of the traditional region of Inner Carniola and is now included with the rest of the municipality in the Littoral–Inner Carniola Statistical Region.

== Geography ==
Zalog is a non-homogenous settlement west of the center of Postojna. The core of the former village has a rural character. It includes the hamlets of Kazarje (or Kozarje, Italian: Casarie) and Pasje Hiše (literally, 'dog houses'), which refers to dog kennels maintained by the Italian police before the Second World War. The village has extensive pastures and partially swampy meadows.

== Name ==
The name Zalog is a fused prepositional phrase that has lost case inflection: za + log, literally 'behind a partially forested (marshy) meadow near water' or 'behind woods near a settlement'.

== History ==
Zalog was annexed by Postojna in 1994, ending its existence as an independent settlement.

== Church ==
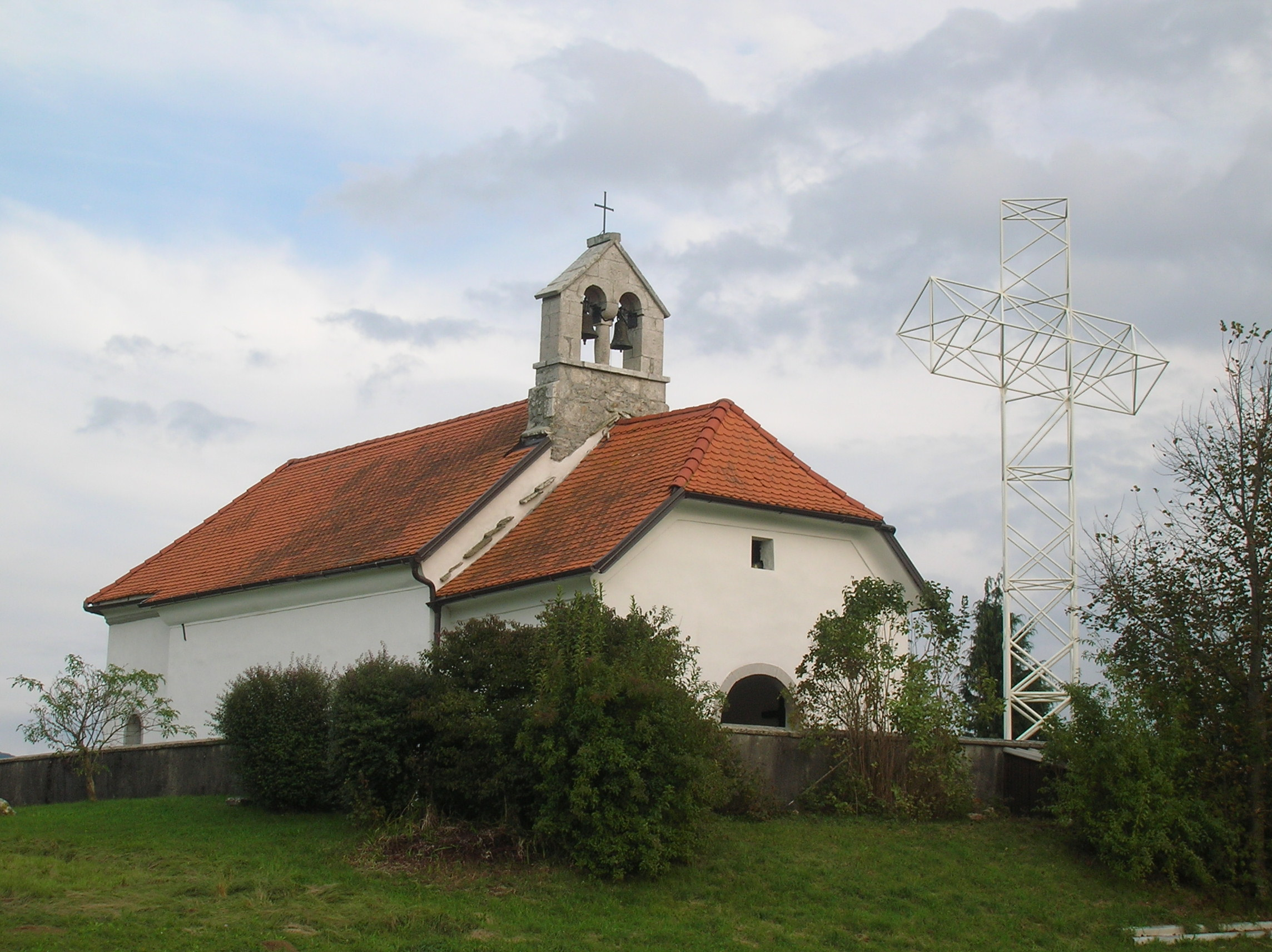
Prophet Daniel Church

The church in Zalog is dedicated to the Prophet Daniel. It stands south of the village, near the freeway from Ljubljana to Razdrto. It is a late Gothic structure with a rib-vaulted chancel with three exterior walls and a rectangular nave, and it has a bell tower and a large portico facing the west. It was renovated in 1625. The church is roofed with rounded tiles.

== Notable people ==
Notable people that were born or lived in Zalog include:

- Jože Piber (1901–1921), poet
