= Slovenska Vas =

Slovenska Vas may refer to:

- Slovenska Vas, Brežice, a settlement in the Municipality of Brežice, southeastern Slovenia
- Slovenska Vas, Kočevje, a settlement in the Municipality of Kočevje, southern Slovenia
- Slovenska Vas, Pivka, a settlement in the Municipality of Pivka, southwestern Slovenia
- Slovenska Vas, Šentrupert, a settlement in the Municipality of Šentrupert, southeastern Slovenia
