= Ribnica, Pivka =

Ribnica
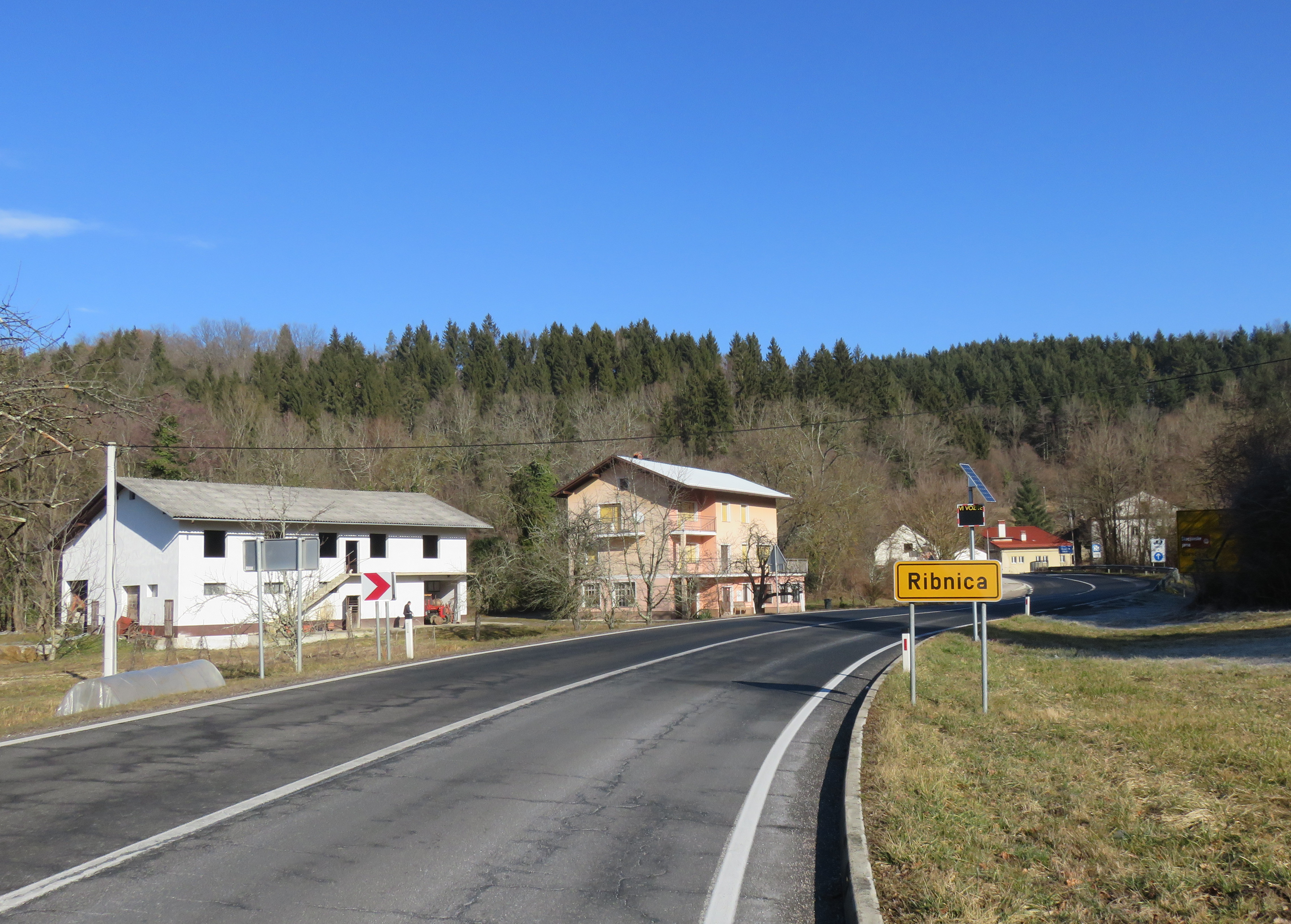

- Location in Slovenia
- Coordinates: 45°37′38.13″N 14°10′7.68″E
- Country: Slovenia
- Traditional region: Inner Carniola
- Statistical region: Littoral–Inner Carniola
- Municipality: Pivka

Area
  - Total: 3.06 km^{2} (1.18 sq mi)
- Elevation: 484.1 m (1,588 ft)

Population (2021)
  - Total: 7

Ribnica (pronounced [ˈɾiːbnitsa]) is a small settlement on the right bank of the Reka River in the Municipality of Pivka in the Inner Carniola region of Slovenia.

== Name ==
The name Ribnica was originally a hydronym derived from the common noun riba 'fish', thus referring to a stream with many fish and, by extension, a settlement along such a stream.

== History ==
Ribnica was formerly a hamlet of Mala Pristava. In 1994, territory from Nadanje Selo, Mala Pristava, Nova Sušica, and Stara Sušica was combined to create Ribnica as a separate settlement.

=== Mass graves ===
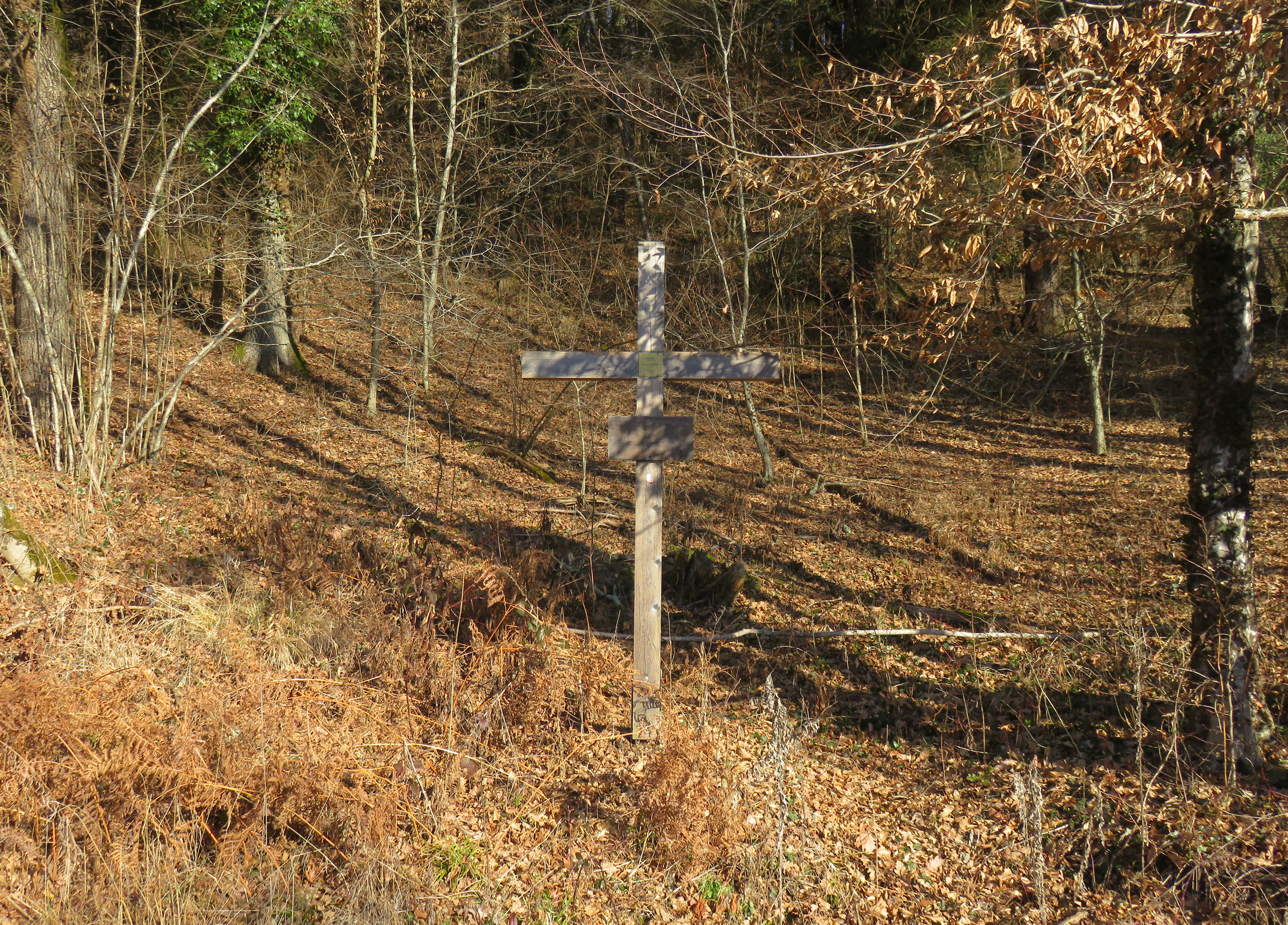
The Loka Mass Grave

Ribnica is the site of two mass graves from the end of World War II. They both contain the remains of German soldiers that fell in May 1945. The Rebri Mass Grave (Slovene: Grobišče Rebri) lies at the end of a meadow 50 meters (160 ft) east of the houses at the main crossroads in the settlement, at the edge of the woods. The Loka Mass Grave (Slovene: Grobišče Loka) lies along the road from Ribnica to Buje about 340 meters (1,120 ft) northwest of the crossroads. The Loka Mass Grave contained the bodies of 31 soldiers killed on May 4, 1945, which were exhumed between September 6 and 13, 2017.

== Cultural heritage ==
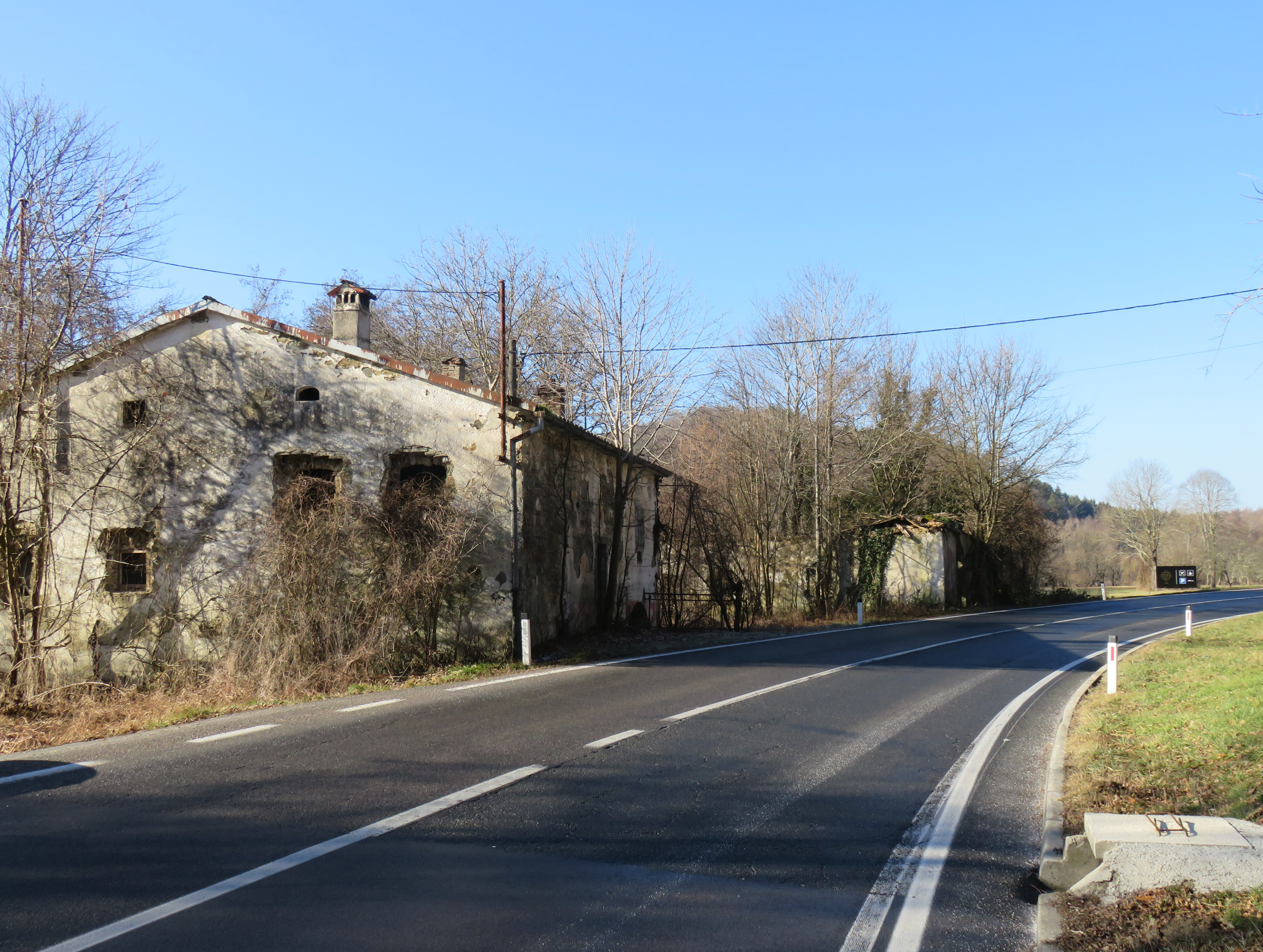
The Stružnik Farm

Several sites in Ribnica have been registered as cultural heritage.

- The Mršnik Farm is located at house no. 7 at the main intersection in Ribnica. It consists of a farmhouse and barn, and an inn and store formerly operated at the property. The carved stone doorframe of the house bears the year 1870.
- The Stružnik Farm is located at Ribnica no. 18 (formerly Nadanje Selo 45), southeast of the main settlement. The house dates from 1711, and the property also has a grain mill dating from 1718 and a sawmill daring from 1725. It stands on the right bank of the Reka River.
- The Lunj Farm is located at Ribnica no. 20 (formerly Nadanje Selo 53), southeast of the main settlement. The house dates to the early 17th century, and the property also has a simple sawmill and grain mill. It stands on the right bank of the Reka River.
