= Buje, Pivka =

Buje
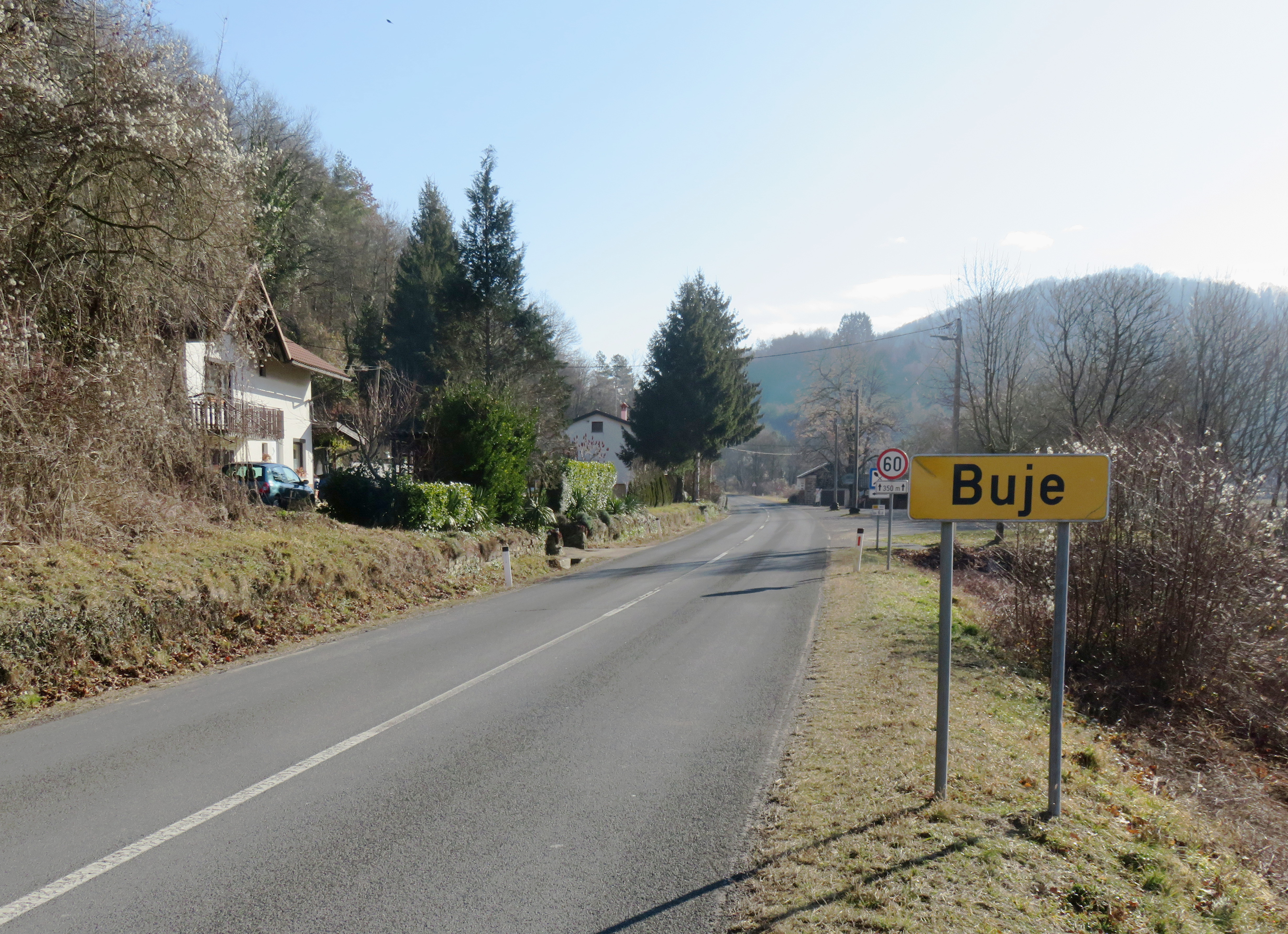

- Location in Slovenia
- Coordinates: 45°39′19.88″N 14°5′15.16″E
- Country: Slovenia
- Traditional region: Inner Carniola
- Statistical region: Littoral–Inner Carniola
- Municipality: Pivka

Area
  - Total: 5.18 km^{2} (2.00 sq mi)
- Elevation: 452.2 m (1,484 ft)

Population (2002)
  - Total: 49

Buje (pronounced [ˈbuːjɛ]) is a small village in the Municipality of Pivka in the Inner Carniola region of Slovenia. The village is located in the valley of the Reka River, between the ravines of Rimače and Žermejnica Creeks. The railway line from Pivka to Divača runs nearby. Buje is also accessible by road from the Reka Valley.

== History ==
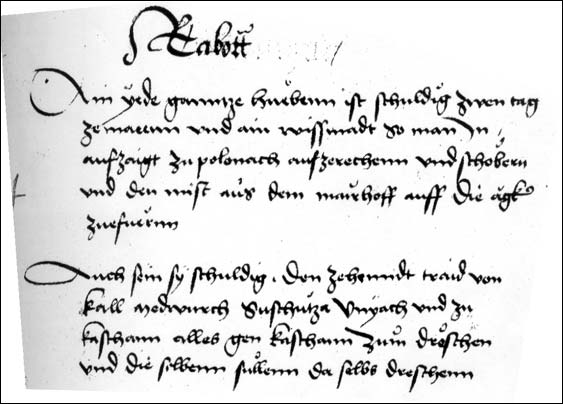
Copy of the Urbarium for Senožeče in 1460

The village was first mentioned in the medieval urban register for Senožeče in 1460. They were mentioned for the second time in 1498 in the urbarium for Postojna. At the time Buje was officially called Vuyach or Wuiach. Until the territorial reorganization in Slovenia, Buje remained part of the old municipality of Postojna.

== Church ==
The local church in the settlement is dedicated to Saint Florian, the patron saint of firefighters, and belongs to the Parish of Košana. The holy water font bears the year 1670, and the year 1705 is carved on the door, added during the renovation of the altar and the entrance. The church was renovated again in 2005.
