= Gornja Košana =

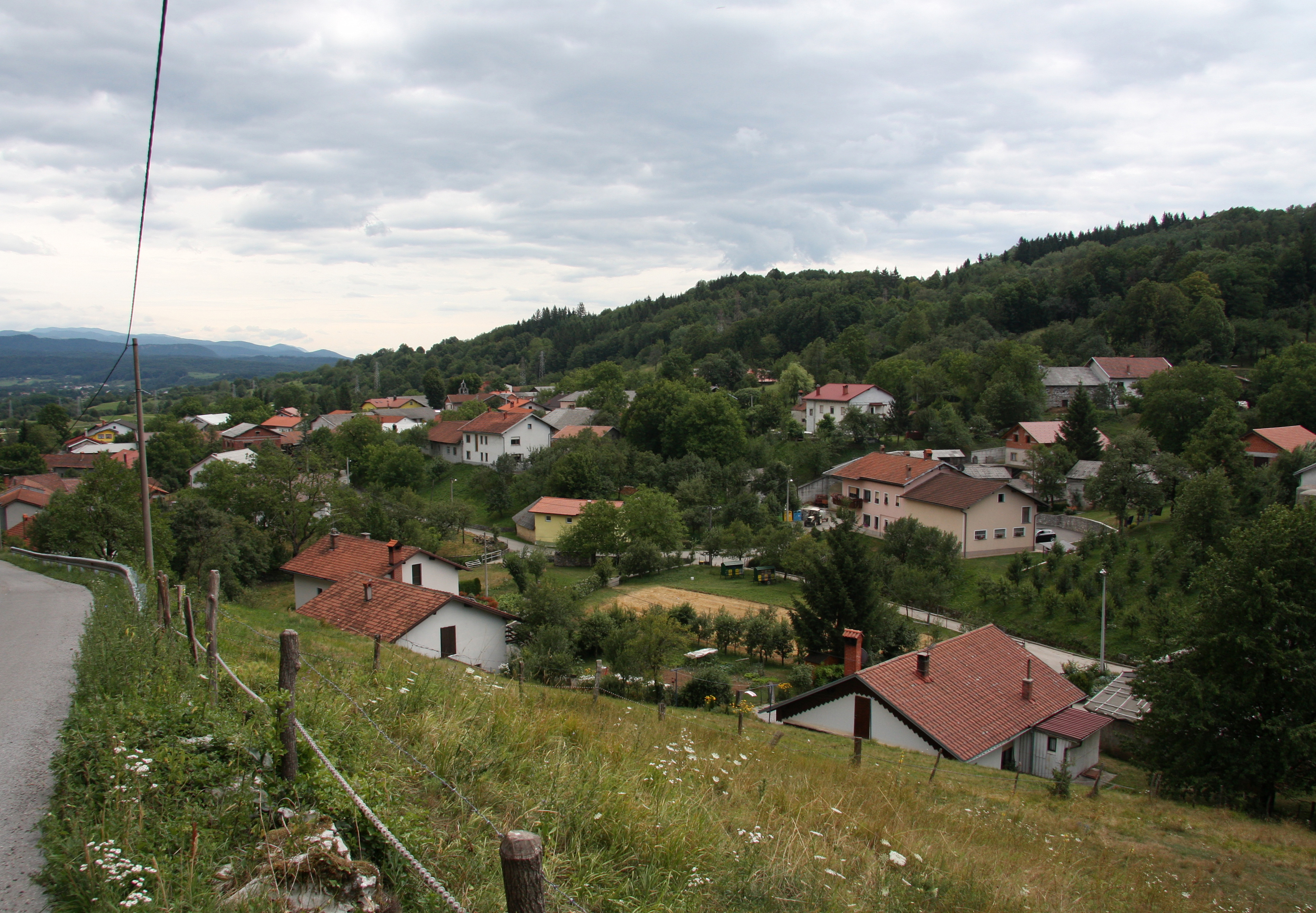

- Location in Slovenia
- Coordinates: 45°39′54.65″N 14°6′50.69″E
- Country: Slovenia
- Traditional region: Inner Carniola
- Statistical region: Littoral–Inner Carniola
- Municipality: Pivka

Area
  - Total: 8.81 km^{2} (3.40 sq mi)
- Elevation: 469.8 m (1,541 ft)

Population (2002)
  - Total: 144

Gornja Košana (pronounced [ˈɡoːɾnja kɔˈʃaːna], in older sources Gorenja Košana, German: Oberkoschana) is a village west of Pivka in the Inner Carniola region of Slovenia.

The local church in the settlement is dedicated to the Visitation of the Blessed Virgin Mary and belongs to the Parish of Košana.
