= Trnje, Pivka =

Trnje
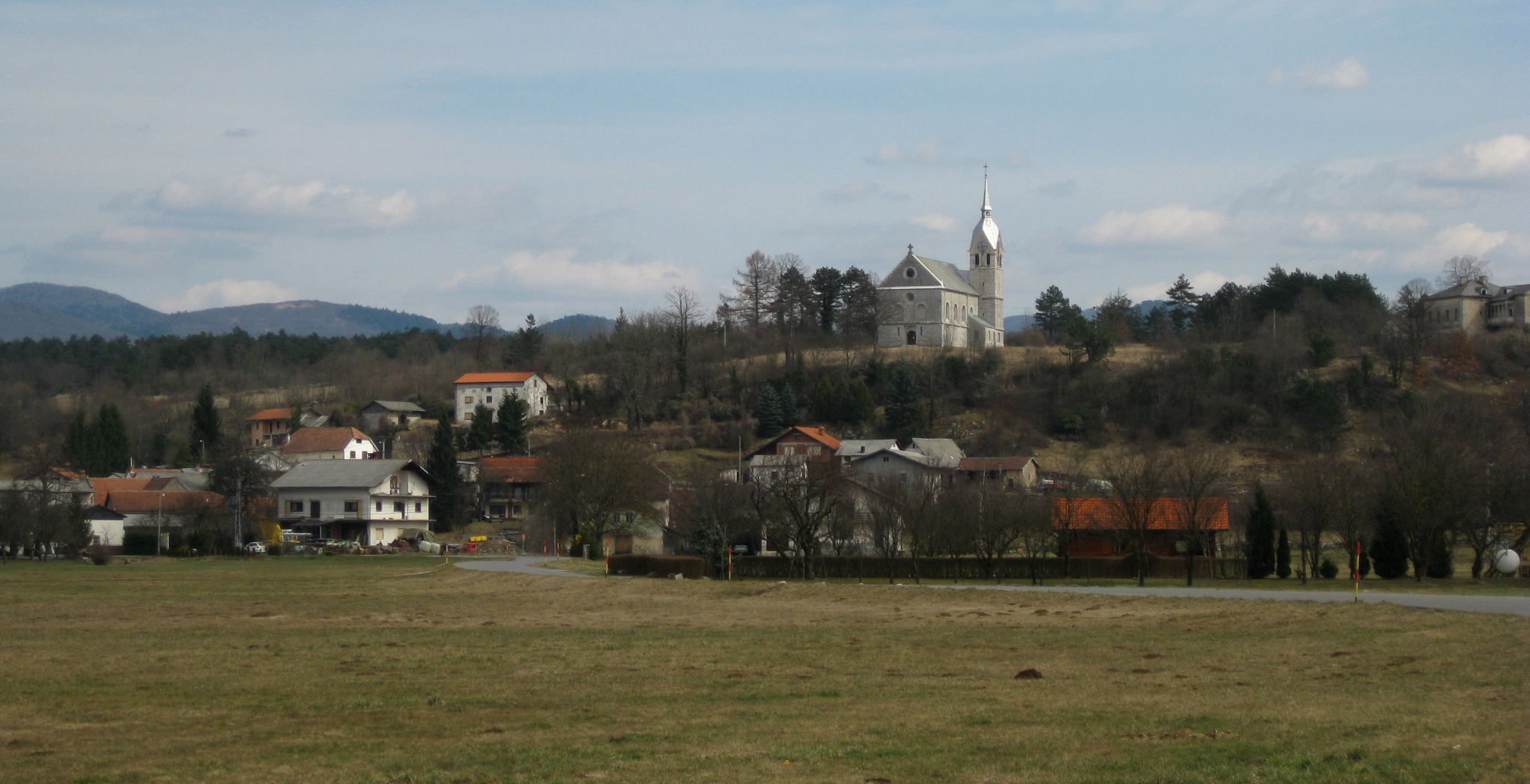

- Location in Slovenia
- Coordinates: 45°41′11.07″N 14°13′29.74″E
- Country: Slovenia
- Traditional region: Inner Carniola
- Statistical region: Littoral–Inner Carniola
- Municipality: Pivka

Area
  - Total: 39.46 km^{2} (15.24 sq mi)
- Elevation: 534.5 m (1,754 ft)

Population (2002)
  - Total: 243

Trnje (pronounced [ˈtəɾnjɛ], German: Dorn) is a village east of Pivka in the Inner Carniola region of Slovenia.

== Mass graves ==
Trnje is the site of two known mass graves associated with the Second World War. The Tiček Cave Mass Grave (Slovene: Grobišče Tičkova jama) lies north of the village, in a shallow karst valley on the east side of Lake Petelinje (Petelinjsko jezero). It contains the remains of undetermined victims based on human bones found at the site by spelunkers. The Shaft 1 by the Muha Enclosure Mass Grave (Grobišče Brezno 1 pri Muhovi ogradi) lies 2 kilometers (1.2 mi) northeast of the village. It was excavated in October 2009, revealing 37 victims and eight German military ID tags. The remains were reburied in December 2009 in Block F of the German military cemetery in Celje.

== Church ==
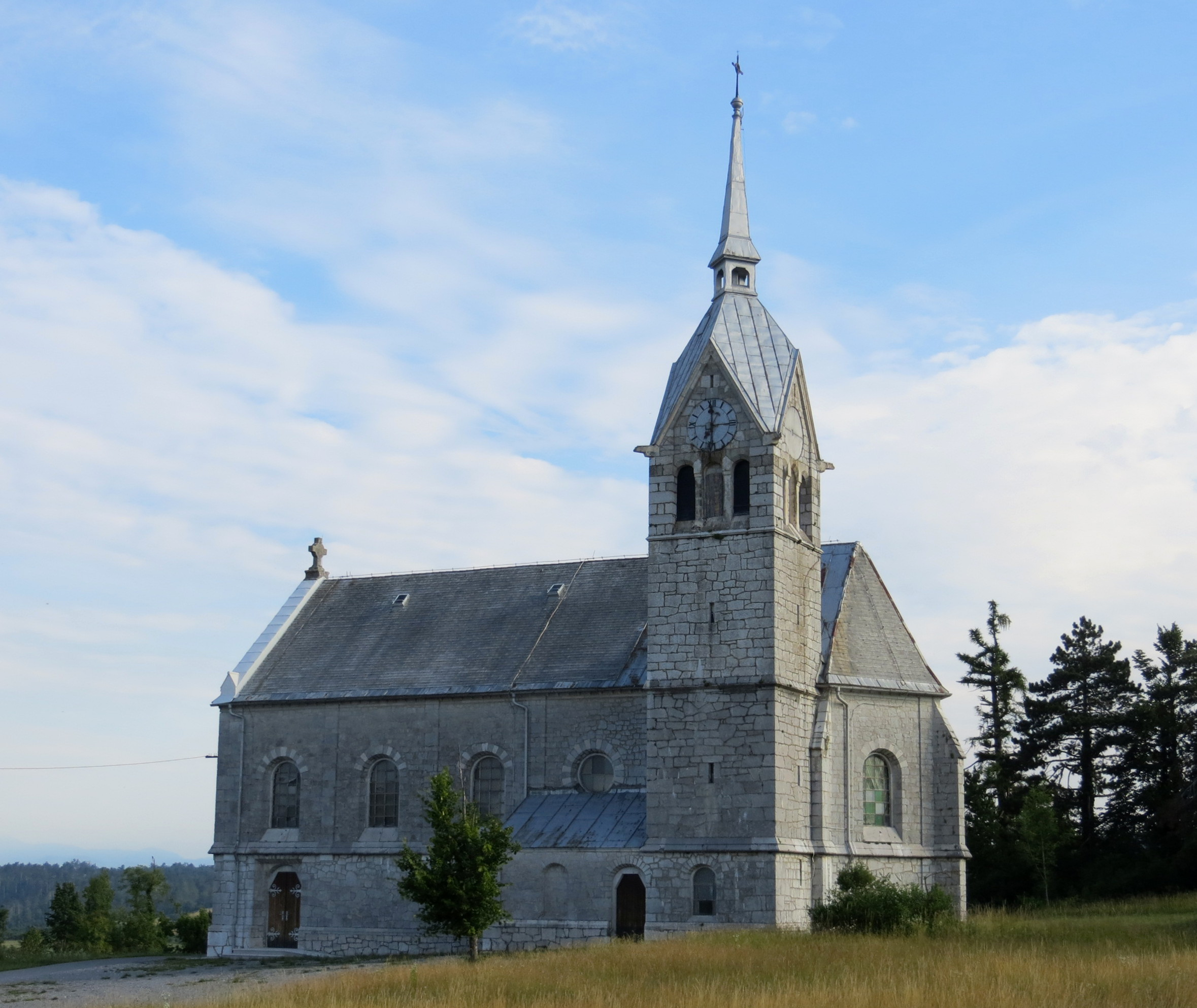
Holy Trinity Church

The parish church in the settlement is dedicated to the Holy Trinity and belongs to the Koper Diocese. It was built in 1895 in the neo-Romanesque style based on plans by the architect Raimund Jeblinger. It stands on a small hill south of the village.

== Recreation ==
The village offers farm tourism and a riding school.
