= Šmihel, Pivka =

Šmihel Šmihel na Krasu (until 1952), Dolane (1952–1990)
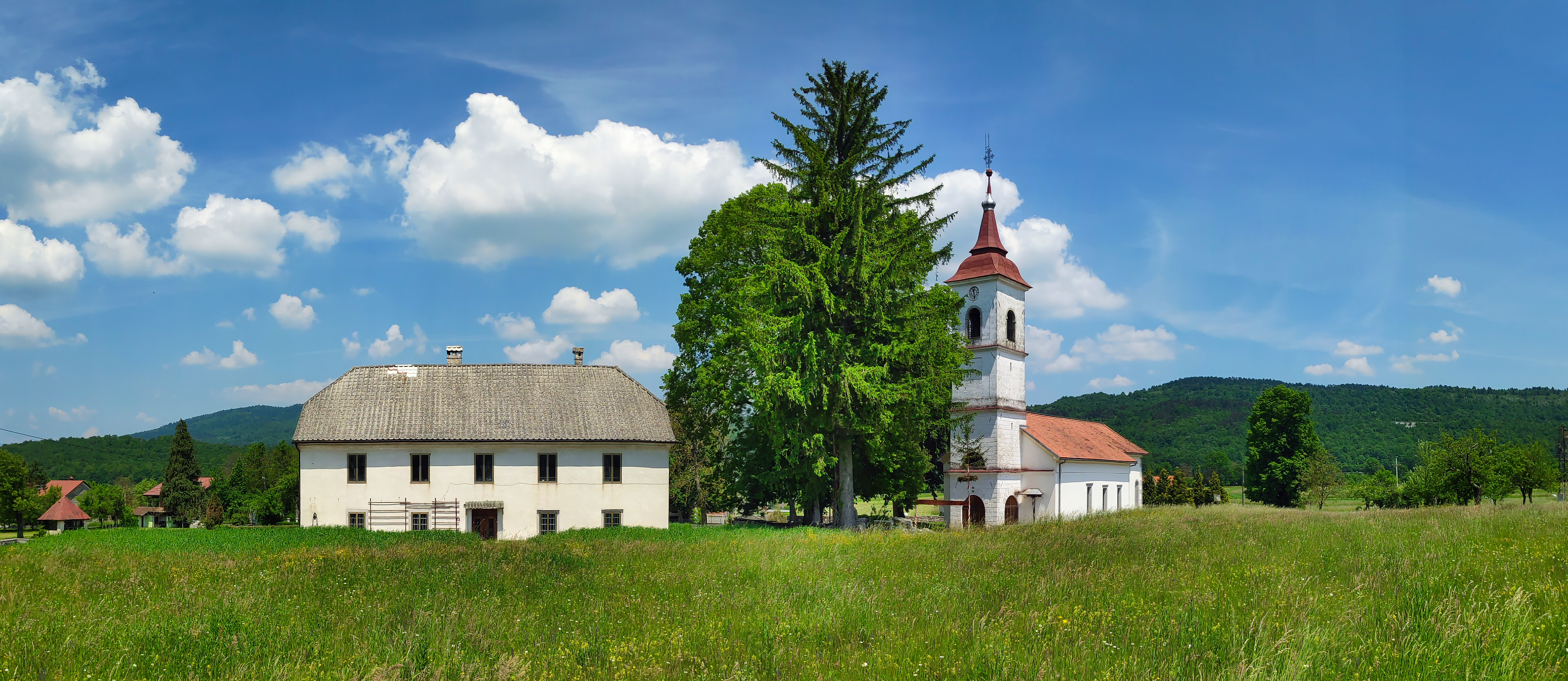

- Location in Slovenia
- Coordinates: 45°39′8.79″N 14°10′47.45″E
- Country: Slovenia
- Traditional region: Inner Carniola
- Statistical region: Littoral–Inner Carniola
- Municipality: Pivka

Area
  - Total: 2.02 km^{2} (0.78 sq mi)
- Elevation: 447.9 m (1,469 ft)

Population (2002)
  - Total: 117

Šmihel (pronounced [ʃmiˈxeːu̯], German: Sankt Michael) is a village south of Pivka in the Inner Carniola region of Slovenia. It includes the hamlet of Ravne (German: Raunach) to the west.

== Name ==
The name of the settlement was changed from Šmihel na Krasu (literally, 'Saint Michael on the Karst') to Dolane in 1952. The name was changed on the basis of the 1948 Law on Names of Settlements and Designations of Squares, Streets, and Buildings as part of efforts by Slovenia's postwar communist government to remove religious elements from toponyms. The name Šmihel was restored in 1990.

== Church ==
The parish church, from which the settlement gets its name, is dedicated to Saint Michael and belongs to the Koper Diocese.
