= Municipality of Pivka =

Municipality of Slovenia

Municipality of Pivka Občina Pivka
- Municipality
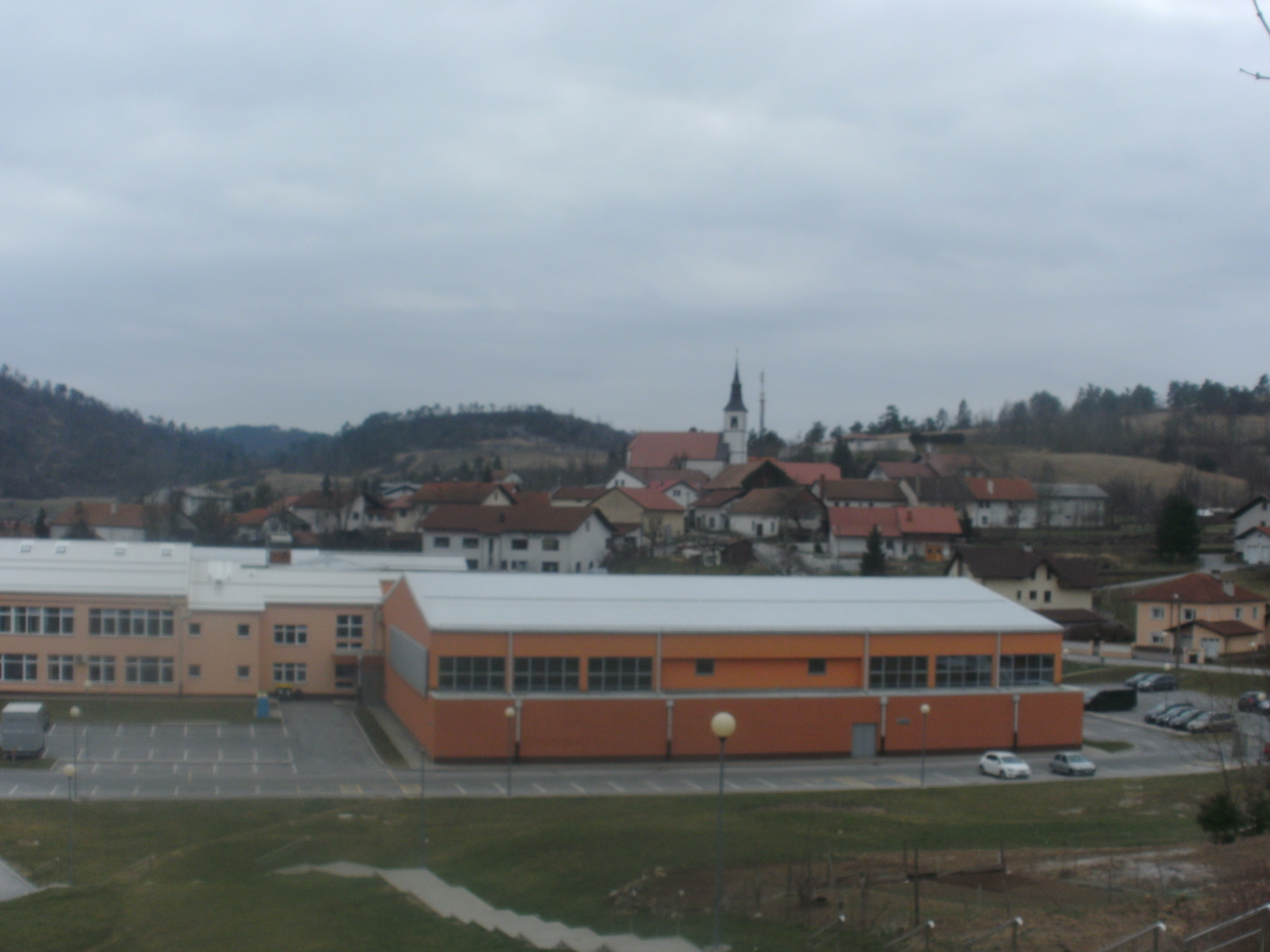

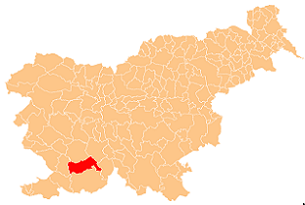
- Location of the Municipality of Pivka in Slovenia
- Coordinates: 45°41′N 14°12′E
- Country: Slovenia

Government
  - Mayor: Robert Smrdelj (Independent)

Area
  - Total: 223.3 km^{2} (86.2 sq mi)

Population (2002)
  - Total: 5,926
  - Density: 26.54/km^{2} (68.73/sq mi)
- Time zone: UTC+01 (CET)
  - Summer (DST): UTC+02 (CEST)

The Municipality of Pivka (pronounced [ˈpiːu̯ka]; Slovene: Občina Pivka) is a municipality in Slovenia in the Pivka Basin in the Littoral–Inner Carniola Statistical Region. Its seat is the town of Pivka. It belongs to the traditional region of Inner Carniola.

== Settlements ==
In addition to the municipal seat of Pivka, the municipality also includes the following settlements:

- Buje
- Čepno
- Dolnja Košana
- Drskovče
- Gornja Košana
- Gradec
- Juršče
- Kal
- Klenik
- Mala Pristava
- Nadanje Selo
- Narin
- Neverke
- Nova Sušica
- Palčje
- Parje
- Petelinje
- Ribnica
- Selce
- Šilentabor
- Slovenska Vas
- Šmihel
- Stara Sušica
- Suhorje
- Trnje
- Velika Pristava
- Volče
- Zagorje

== History ==
Although the Pivka region has been a strategically important location since ancient times, it became even more important with the construction of the Vienna–Trieste railway (the Austrian Southern Railway) in 1857 and the Št. Peter na Krasu–Rijeka railway twenty years later. In 1930, while it was under the Italian control, the strategic hills over the town of Pivka were heavily fortified and included in the Alpine Wall system of defenses, which stretched from the Bay of Genoa to the Kvarner Gulf. Št. Peter na Krasu and the nearby barracks in Hrastje ("Crastie di San Pietro" then, now part of the town of Pivka) were one of the strongest points in the eastern section of the Alpine Wall.

== Military History Park ==
On the basis of this military history from ancient times to the 20th century, the Municipality of Pivka has arranged the Pivka Park of Military History, with many tanks and artillery, a small aircraft collection, and a former Yugoslav Una-class commando submarine (P-913 Zeta). The municipality hopes to develop the park into a tourism destination that will complement alongside Postojna Cave and other local attractions. The first military re-enactment was staged in the park in September 2007.
