= Zagorje, Pivka =

Zagorje
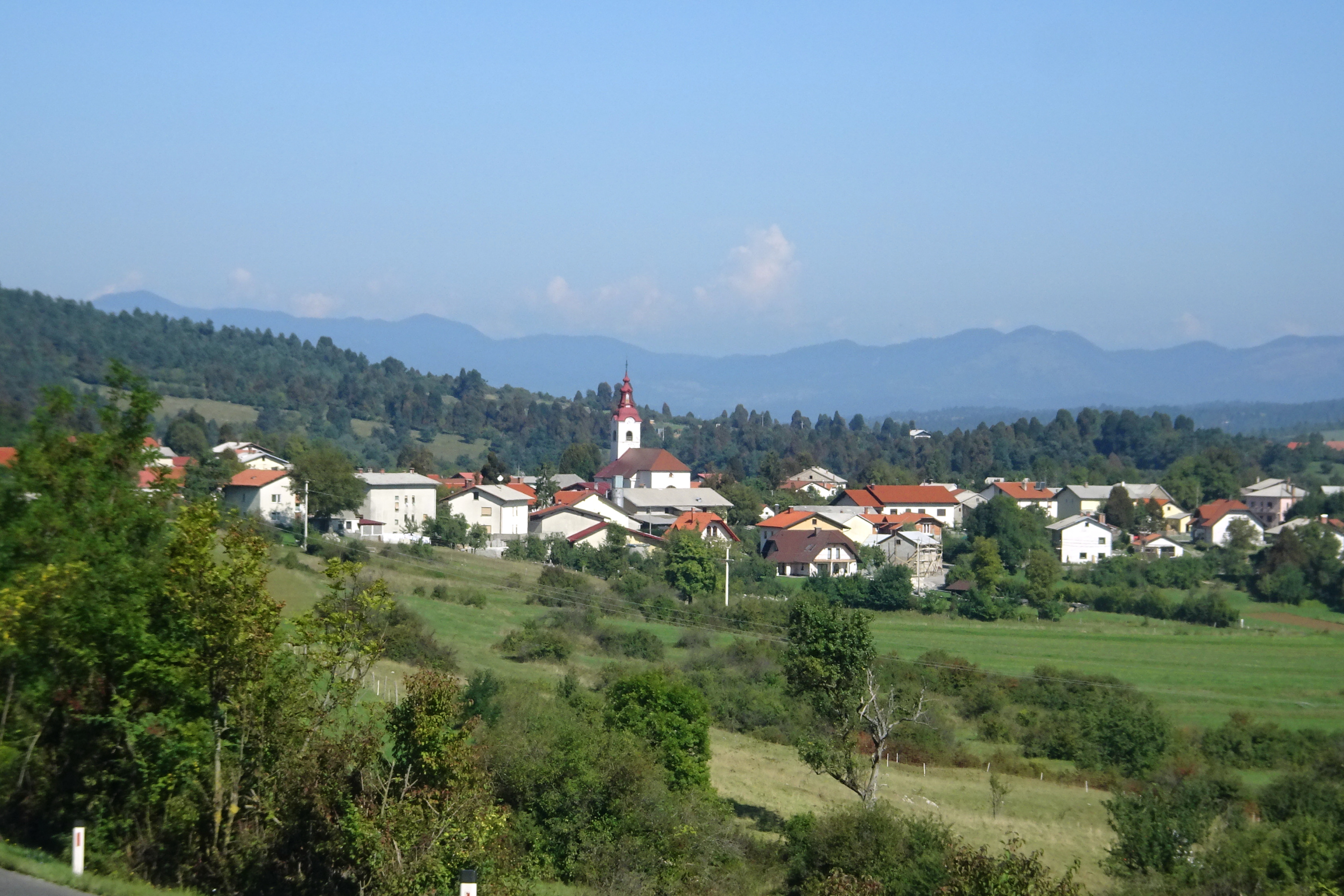

- Location in Slovenia
- Coordinates: 45°38′28.08″N 14°13′22.28″E
- Country: Slovenia
- Traditional region: Inner Carniola
- Statistical region: Littoral–Inner Carniola
- Municipality: Pivka

Area
  - Total: 7.59 km^{2} (2.93 sq mi)
- Elevation: 576.6 m (1,892 ft)

Population (2002)
  - Total: 358

Zagorje (pronounced [zaˈɡoːɾjɛ]; German: Sagorje) is a village in the Municipality of Pivka in the Inner Carniola region of Slovenia.

The parish church in the settlement is dedicated to Saint Helena and belongs to the Koper Diocese. The chapel at the cemetery, north of the settlement, is dedicated to Saint Paul.

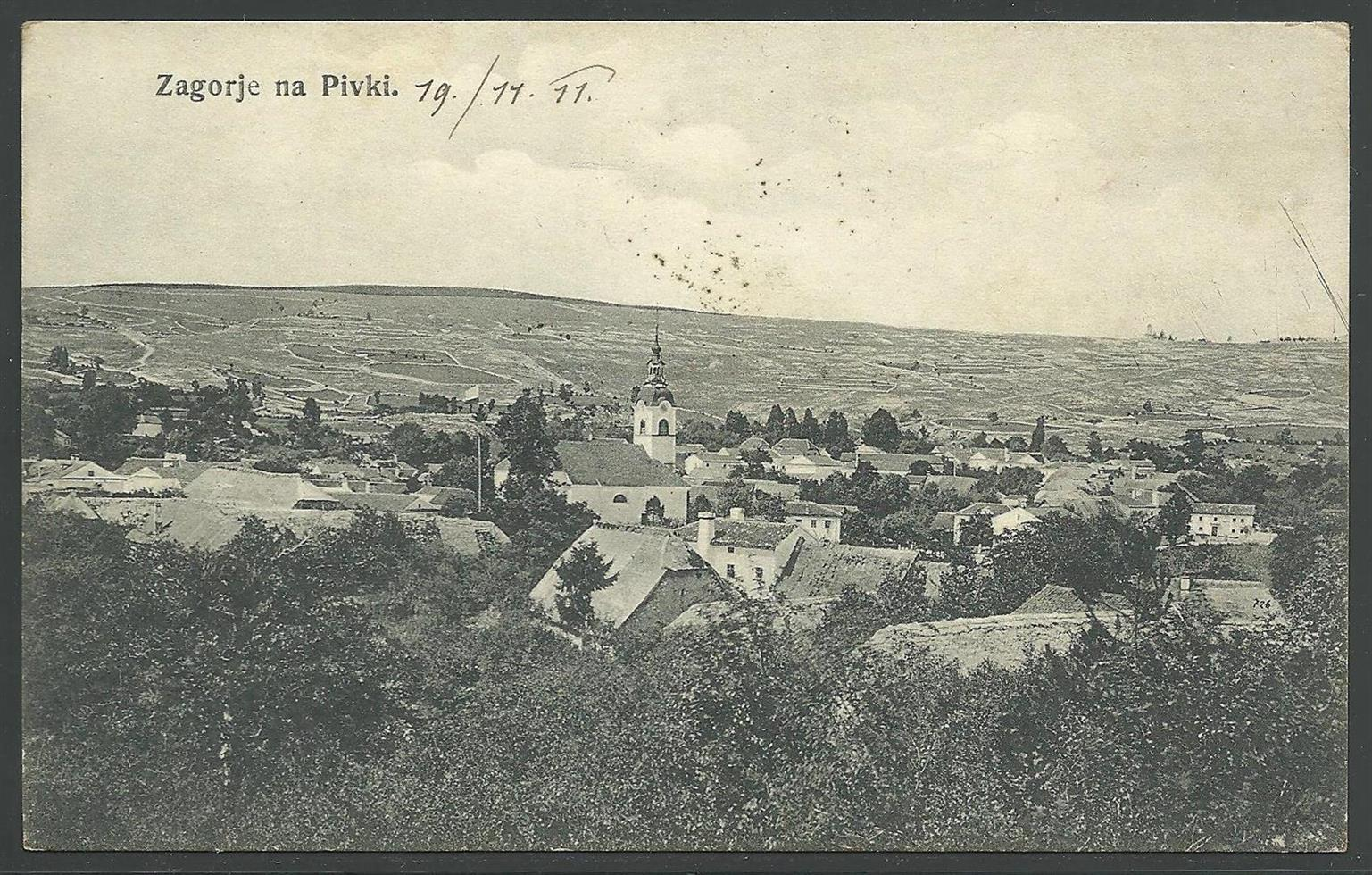
Zagorje in 1911
