= Dolnja Košana =

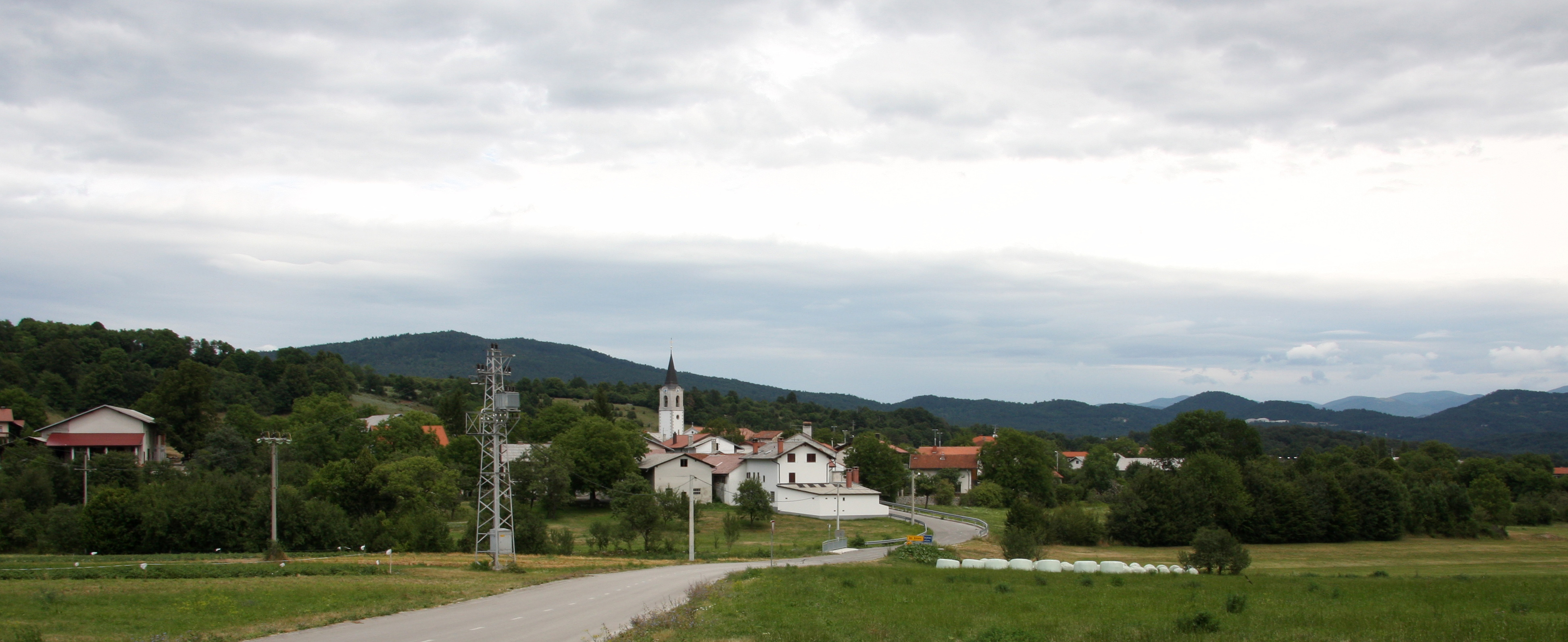

- Location in Slovenia
- Coordinates: 45°39′54.94″N 14°7′25.2″E
- Country: Slovenia
- Traditional region: Inner Carniola
- Statistical region: Littoral–Inner Carniola
- Municipality: Pivka

Area
  - Total: 1.55 km^{2} (0.60 sq mi)
- Elevation: 454 m (1,490 ft)

Population (2002)
  - Total: 384

Dolnja Košana (pronounced [ˈdoːlnja kɔˈʃaːna], in older sources Dolenja Košana, German: Unterkoschana) is a village west of Pivka in the Inner Carniola region of Slovenia.

The Košana parish church in the settlement is dedicated to Saint Stephen and belongs to the Koper Diocese.

== Notable people ==
Notable people that were born or lived in Dolnja Košana include:

- Franc Šturm (1881–1944), linguist, translator, and communist activist
