= Pivka =

Pivka Šent Peter na Krasu (until 1952)
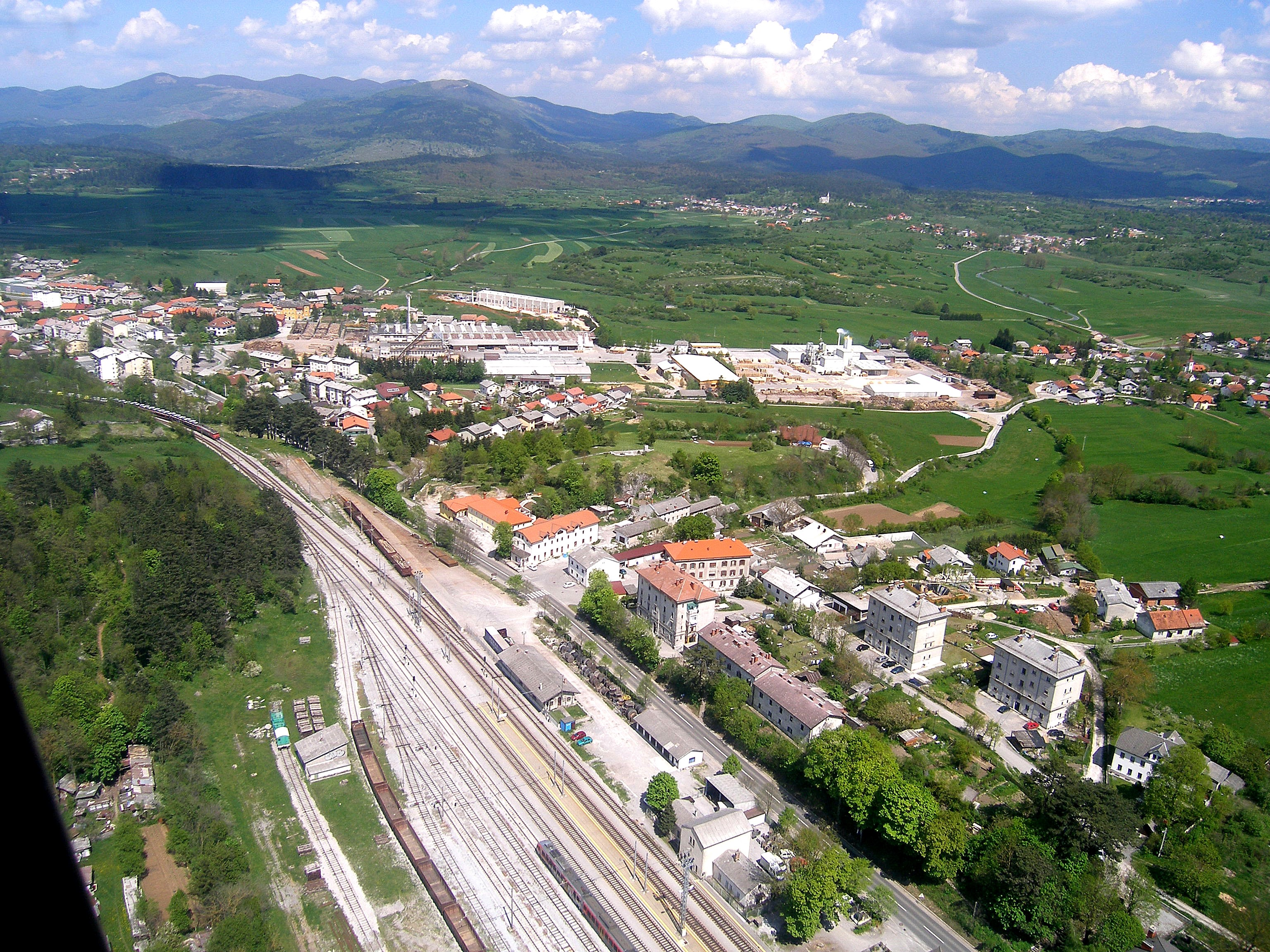

- Location in Slovenia
- Coordinates: 45°41′N 14°12′E
- Country: Slovenia
- Traditional region: Inner Carniola
- Statistical region: Littoral–Inner Carniola
- Municipality: Pivka
- Elevation: 554 m (1,818 ft)

Population (2002)
  - Total: 2,059

Pivka (pronounced [ˈpiːu̯ka], German: St. Peter, Italian: San Pietro del Carso) is a small town in Slovenia in the Pivka Basin in the Karst region. It is the seat of the Municipality of Pivka. It belongs to the traditional region of Inner Carniola.

== Name ==
Pivka was first mentioned in 1300 as villa Sancti Petri super Piucha ('St. Peter above the Pivka River'), and in 1498 as Sannt Peter. The name of the settlement was changed from Šent Peter na Krasu (literally, 'Saint Peter in the Karst') to Pivka in 1952. The name was changed on the basis of the 1948 Law on Names of Settlements and Designations of Squares, Streets, and Buildings as part of efforts by Slovenia's postwar communist government to remove religious elements from toponyms. Before it replaced the original name of the settlement, the name Pivka originally referred to the Pivka River. This name was first attested in 1300 as Piuca or Piucha (and as Peucha in 1335). The name is derived from the Slovene common noun pivka 'karst sinkhole'.

== History ==
Although the Pivka region has been a strategically important location since ancient times, it became even more important with the construction of the railway from Vienna to Trieste (the Austrian Southern Railway) in 1857 and the railway from Št. Peter na Krasu to Rijeka twenty years later. In 1930, while it was under the Italian control, the strategic hills over the town were heavily fortified and included in the Alpine Wall system of defenses, which stretched from the Bay of Genoa to the Kvarner Gulf. Št. Peter na Krasu and the nearby barracks in Hrastje (now part of the town of Pivka) were one of the strongest points in the eastern section of the Alpine Wall.

== Churches ==
The parish church in the town of Pivka is dedicated to Saint Peter and belongs to the Koper Diocese. A second church in the Radohova Vas neighborhood of the town belongs to the same parish and is dedicated to Saint Lawrence.

== Museum ==
The Pivka Military History Park is a museum with heavy weapons, military vehicles, training and fighter aircraft, a helicopter and a Yugoslav Una-class commando submarine.
