= Littoral–Inner Carniola Statistical Region =

Coordinates: 45°41′00″N 14°14′00″E

Littoral–Inner Carniola Statistical Region primorsko-notranjska statistična regija
- Statistical region
- Municipalities: 6
- Largest city: Postojna

Area
  - Total: 1,456 km^{2} (562 sq mi)

Population (2020)
  - Total: 52,841
  - Density: 36.29/km^{2} (94.00/sq mi)

Statistics
  - Households: 20,584
  - Employed: 18,989
  - Registered unemployed: 2,899
  - College/university students: 1,986
  - Regional GDP (2019): EUR 853 m (EUR 16,154 per capita)
- HDI (2022): 0.888 very high · 10th

The Littoral–Inner Carniola Statistical Region (Slovene: primorsko-notranjska statistična regija) is a statistical region in southwest Slovenia. Until January 1, 2015 it was named the Inner Carniola–Karst Statistical Region (Slovene: notranjsko-kraška statistična regija).

The karst terrain, with Postojna Cave and intermittent Lake Cerknica, is the most important natural feature of this statistical region. This is one of the smallest statistical regions in Slovenia, and it is the least densely populated, with a population density six times lower than the Central Slovenia Statistical Region. The region is among the economically less developed ones in the country because in 2012 it contributed only 1.8% of Slovenia’s GDP. With an average of four employees per company, the enterprises in the region are among the smallest in Slovenia. In 2012, agriculture in this region generated around 6% of gross value added, which is one of the highest shares of gross value added by agriculture per individual region. In 2013, the average utilised agricultural area per farm was the highest in this region. The region has the highest employment rate in Slovenia (it was 59.9% in 2013), and the registered unemployment rate is among the lowest. The region also has the highest share of women in tertiary education (151 female students per 100 male students).

== Municipalities ==
The Littoral–Inner Carniola Statistical Region comprises the following 6 municipalities:

- Bloke
- Cerknica
- Ilirska Bistrica
- Loška Dolina
- Pivka
- Postojna

== Demographics ==
The population in 2020 was 52,841. It has a total area of 1,456 km^{2}.

== Economy ==
Employment structure: 55.8% services, 36.8% industry, 7.4% agriculture.

=== Tourism ===
It attracts only 4.1% of the total number of tourists in Slovenia, most being from Italy (17.8%). Only 9.3% of tourists are from Slovenia.

== Transportation ==
- Length of motorways: 32.5 km
- Length of other roads: 1241.9 km

== Sources ==
- Slovenian regions in figures 2006
