= Black Sea =

Eurasian sea northeast of the Mediterranean

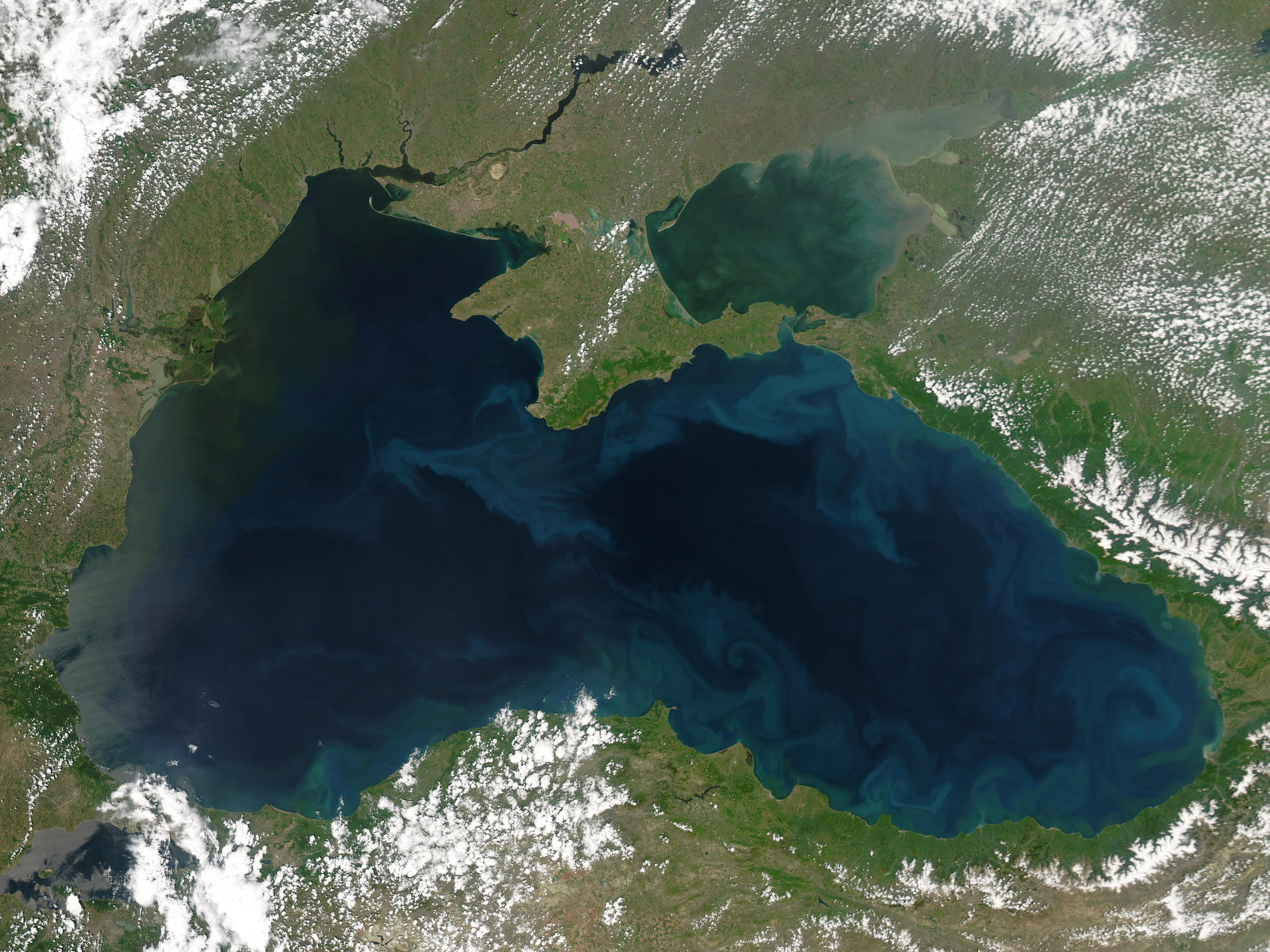
- Satellite image of the Black Sea
- Interactive map of Black Sea
- Map of the Black Sea with bathymetry and surrounding relief
- Location: Eastern Europe and West Asia
- Coordinates: 44°N 35°E
- Type: Sea
- Primary inflows: Sea of Marmara, Sea of Azov, Danube, Dnieper, Don, Dniester, Kuban, Black Sea undersea river (through the Bosphorus Strait)
- Primary outflows: Bosporus, Kerch Strait
- Basin countries: Bulgaria; Georgia; Romania; Russia; Turkey; Ukraine; Partially recognised states: Abkhazia (Note: The political status of Abkhazia is disputed. Having unilaterally declared independence from Georgia in 1992, Abkhazia is formally recognised as an independent state by 4 UN member states (three other states previously recognised it but then withdrew their recognition), while the remainder of the international community recognizes it as de jure Georgian territory. Georgia continues to claim the area as its own territory, designating it as Russian-occupied territory.); A large number of countries included in drainage basins for inflow rivers
- Max. length: 1,175 km (730 mi)
- Surface area: 436,400 km^{2} (168,500 sq mi)
- Average depth: 1,253 m (4,111 ft)
- Max. depth: 2,212 m (7,257 ft)
- Water volume: 547,000 km^{3} (131,200 cu mi)
- Islands: 10+

The Black Sea is a marginal sea located between Europe and Asia, east of the Balkans, south of the East European Plain, west of the Caucasus, and north of Anatolia. It is bordered by Bulgaria, Georgia, Romania, Russia, Turkey, and Ukraine. The Black Sea is supplied by major rivers, principally the Danube, Dnieper and Dniester. Consequently, while six countries have a coastline on the sea, its drainage basin includes parts of 24 countries in Europe.

The Black Sea, not including the Sea of Azov, covers 436,400 km^{2} (168,500 sq mi), has a maximum depth of 2,212 m (7,257 ft), and a volume of 547,000 km^{3} (131,000 cu mi). Most of its coasts ascend rapidly. These rises are the Pontic Mountains to the south, the southwest-facing peninsulas, the Caucasus Mountains to the east, and the Crimean Mountains to the mid-north. In the west, the coast is generally small floodplains below foothills such as the Strandzha; Cape Emine, a dwindling of the east end of the Balkan Mountains; and the Dobruja Plateau considerably farther north. The longest east–west extent is about 1,175 km (730 mi). Important cities along the coast include (clockwise from the Bosporus) the northern suburbs of Istanbul, Burgas, Varna, Constanța, Odesa, Yevpatoria, Sevastopol, Yalta, Kerch, Novorossiysk, Sochi, Poti, Batumi, Rize, Trabzon, Ordu, Samsun and Zonguldak.

The Black Sea has a positive water balance, with an annual net outflow of 300 km^{3} (72 cu mi) per year through the Bosporus and the Dardanelles into the Aegean Sea. While the net flow of water through the Bosporus and Dardanelles (known collectively as the Turkish Straits) is out of the Black Sea, water generally flows in both directions simultaneously: Denser, more saline water from the Aegean flows into the Black Sea underneath the less dense, fresher water that flows out of the Black Sea. This creates a significant and permanent layer of deep water that does not drain or mix and is therefore anoxic. This anoxic layer is responsible for the preservation of ancient shipwrecks which have been found in the Black Sea, which ultimately drains into the Atlantic Ocean, via the Turkish Straits and the Aegean Sea into the Mediterranean Sea, and from it to the Atlantic proper through the Strait of Gibraltar. The Bosporus strait connects it to the small Sea of Marmara which in turn is connected to the Aegean Sea via the strait of the Dardanelles. To the north, the Black Sea is connected to the Sea of Azov by the Kerch Strait.

The water level has varied significantly over geological time. Due to these variations in the water level in the basin, the surrounding shelf and associated aprons have sometimes been dry land. At certain critical water levels, connections with surrounding water bodies can become established. It is through the most active of these connective routes, the Turkish Straits, that the Black Sea joins the World Ocean. During geological periods when this hydrological link was not present, the Black Sea was an endorheic basin, operating independently of the global ocean system (similar to the Caspian Sea today). Currently, the Black Sea water level is relatively high; thus, water is being exchanged with the Mediterranean. The Black Sea undersea river is a current of particularly saline water flowing through the Bosporus Strait and along the seabed of the Black Sea, the first of its kind discovered.

== Name ==
=== Modern names ===
Current names of the sea are usually equivalents of the English name 'Black Sea', including these given in the countries bordering the sea:

- Abkhaz: Амшын Еиқәа, romanized: Amŝən Ejkʷa, IPA: [ɑmʂɨn ɛjkʷʰɑ]
- Adyghe: Хы Шӏуцӏэ, romanized: Xə Šʷʼucʼɛ, IPA: [xɘ ʃʷʼtsʼɜ]
- Armenian: Սեւ ծով, romanized: Sev cov, IPA: [sɛv t͡sɔv]
- Azerbaijani: Qara dəniz, IPA: [ɡɑˈɾɑ dæˈniz]
- Bulgarian: Чeрно морe, romanized: Čérno moré, IPA: [ˈt͡ʃɛrno moˈrɛ]
- Crimean Tatar: Qara deñiz, Къара денъиз, IPA: [qɑrɑ deŋiz]
- Gagauz: Kara deniz
- Georgian: შავი ზღვა, romanized: Shavi Zghva, IPA: [ʃavi zʁʷa]
- Laz and Mingrelian: უჩა ზუღა, romanized: Ucha Zugha, IPA: [ˈutʃä ˈzuɣä], or simply ზუღა, Zugha, IPA: [ˈzuɣä], "Sea"
- Persian: دریای سیاه, romanized: daryā-ye siyāh
- Romanian: Marea Neagră, pronounced [ˈmare̯a ˈne̯aɡrə]
- Russian: Чёрное мо́ре, romanized: Chornoye more, IPA: [ˈtɕɵrnəjɪ ˈmorʲɪ]
- Turkish: Karadeniz, IPA: [kaˈɾadeniz]
- Ukrainian: Чо́рне мо́ре, romanized: Chorne more, IPA: [ˈtʃɔrne ˈmɔre]

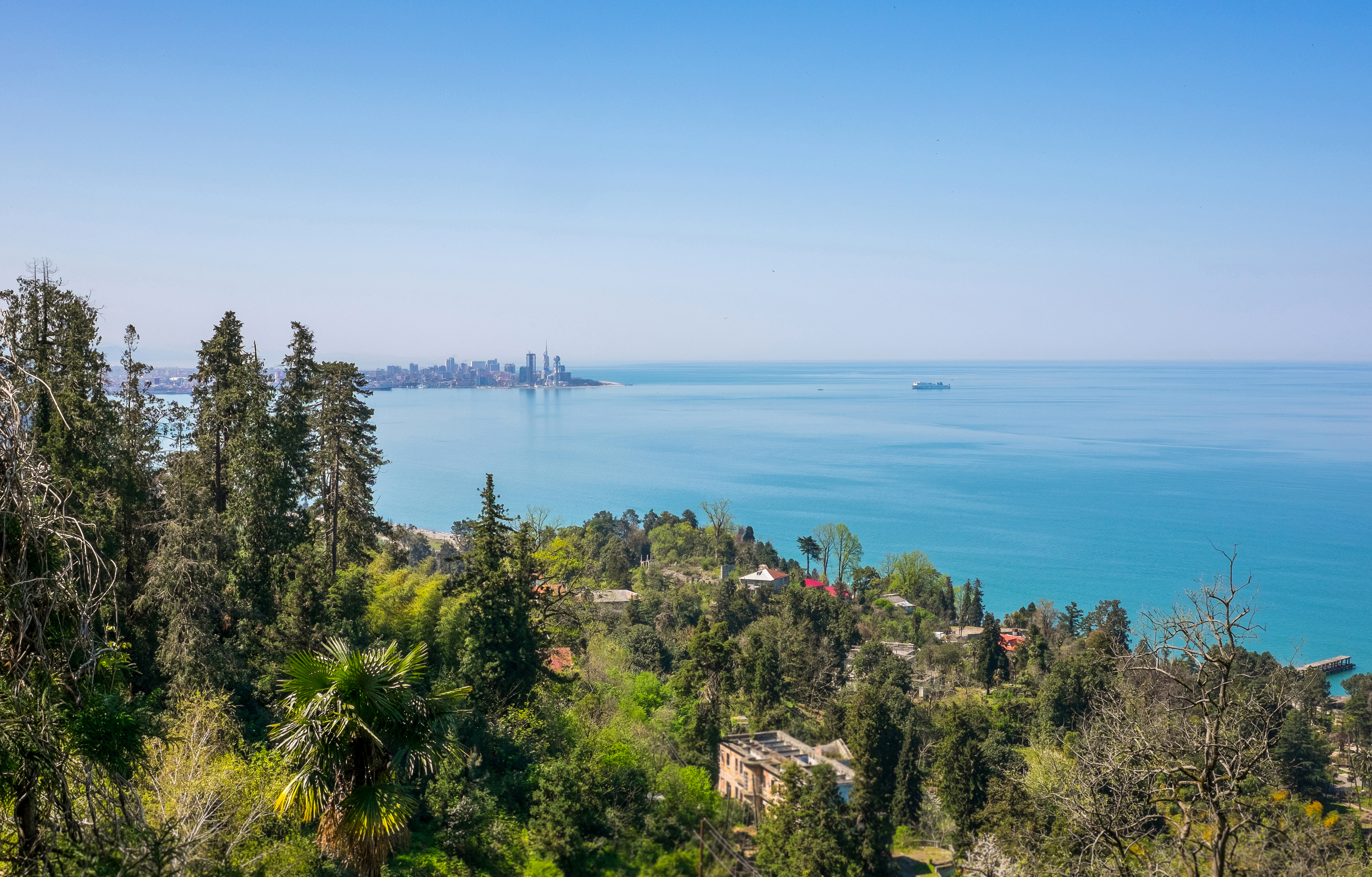
Black Sea coast of western Georgia with the skyline of Batumi on the horizon

Such names have not yet been shown conclusively to predate the 13th century.

In Greece, the historical name 'Euxine Sea', which holds a different literal meaning (see below), is still widely used:

- Greek: Εύξεινος Πόντος, romanized: Éfxinos Póndos, lit. 'Hospitable Sea', [ˈefksinos ˈpondos]; the name Μαύρη Θάλασσα, Mávri Thálassa, 'Black Sea', [ˈmavɾi ˈθalasa], is also used. It is also known among Pontic Greeks as Πόντος Εὔξεινος Póntos Éfxeinos.

The Black Sea is one of four seas named in English after common color terms – the others being the Red Sea, the White Sea and the Yellow Sea.

=== Historical names and etymology ===
The earliest known name of the Black Sea is the 'Sea of Zalpa', so-called by both the Hattians and their conquerors, the Hittites. The Hattic city of Zalpa was "situated probably at or near the estuary of the Marrassantiya River, the modern Kızıl Irmak, on the Black Sea coast."

The principal Greek name Póntos Áxeinos is generally accepted to be a rendering of the Iranian word *axšaina- ('dark-colored'). Ancient Greek voyagers adopted the name as Á-xe(i)nos, identified with the Greek word áxeinos ('inhospitable'). The name Πόντος Ἄξεινος Póntos Áxeinos ('Inhospitable Sea'), first attested in Pindar (c. 475 BC), was considered an ill omen and was euphemized to its opposite, Εὔξεινος Πόντος Eúxeinos Póntos ('Hospitable Sea'), also first attested in Pindar. This became the commonly used designation in Greek, although in mythological contexts the 'true' name Póntos Áxeinos remained favored.

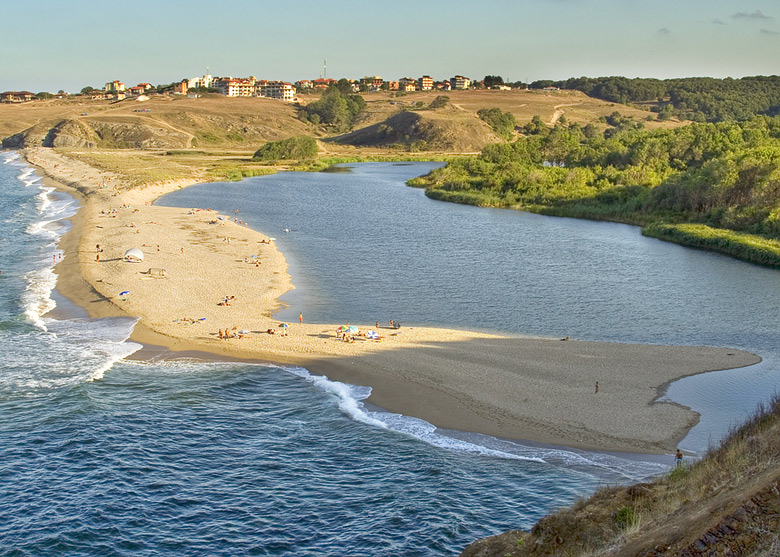
The estuary of the Veleka in the Black Sea. Longshore drift has deposited sediment along the shoreline which has led to the formation of a spit (Sinemorets, Bulgaria).

Strabo's Geographica (1.2.10) reports that in antiquity, the Black Sea was often simply called 'the Sea' (ὁ πόντος ho Pontos). He thought that the sea was called the 'Inhospitable Sea' Πόντος Ἄξεινος Póntos Áxeinos by the inhabitants of the Pontus region of the southern shoreline before Greek colonization due to its difficult navigation and hostile barbarian natives (7.3.6), and that the name was changed to 'hospitable' after the Milesians colonized the region, bringing it into the Greek world.

Popular supposition derives 'Black Sea' from the dark color of the water or climatic conditions. Some scholars understand the name to be derived from a system of Turkic color symbolism representing the cardinal directions, with black or dark for north, red for south, white for west, and green or light blue for east. Hence, 'Black Sea' meant 'Northern Sea'. According to this scheme, the name could only have originated with a people living between the northern (black) and southern (red) seas: this points to the Achaemenids (550–330 BC). However, this interpretation has been contested. The emergence of the current name in Greek may also be due to phonetic affinity in mare maius, mare Maggiore ('Great Sea') with the Greek word mavros ('black').

In the Greater Bundahishn, a Middle Persian Zoroastrian scripture, the Black Sea is called Siyābun. In the 10th-century Persian geography book Hudud al-'Alam, the Black Sea is called 'Georgian Sea' (daryā-yi Gurz). The Georgian Chronicles use the name zğua sperisa ზღუა სპერისა ('Sea of Speri') after the Kartvelian tribe of Speris or Saspers. Medieval Russian chroniclers used the name Pontskoye more (Old Russian: Поньтьское море), although the Russian explorer Ignaty Smolnyanin (fl. 1389–1405) used the name 'Great Sea'. Until the 15th–16th centuries, the name 'Russian Sea' (Russian: Русское море, romanized: Russkoye more) was also used. The name emerged in the 10th century following incursions into Constantinople, "because Russians used to trample the city often".

Other modern names such as Chyornoye more and Karadeniz (both meaning 'Black Sea') originated during the 13th century. A 1570 map Asiae Nova Descriptio from Abraham Ortelius's Theatrum Orbis Terrarum labels the sea Mar Maggior ('Great Sea'), compare Latin Mare major.

English writers of the 18th century often used Euxine Sea (/ˈjuːksɪn/ or /ˈjuːkˌsaɪn/). During the Ottoman Empire, it was called either Bahr-i Siyah (Perso-Arabic) or Karadeniz (Ottoman Turkish), both meaning 'Black Sea'.

== Geography ==
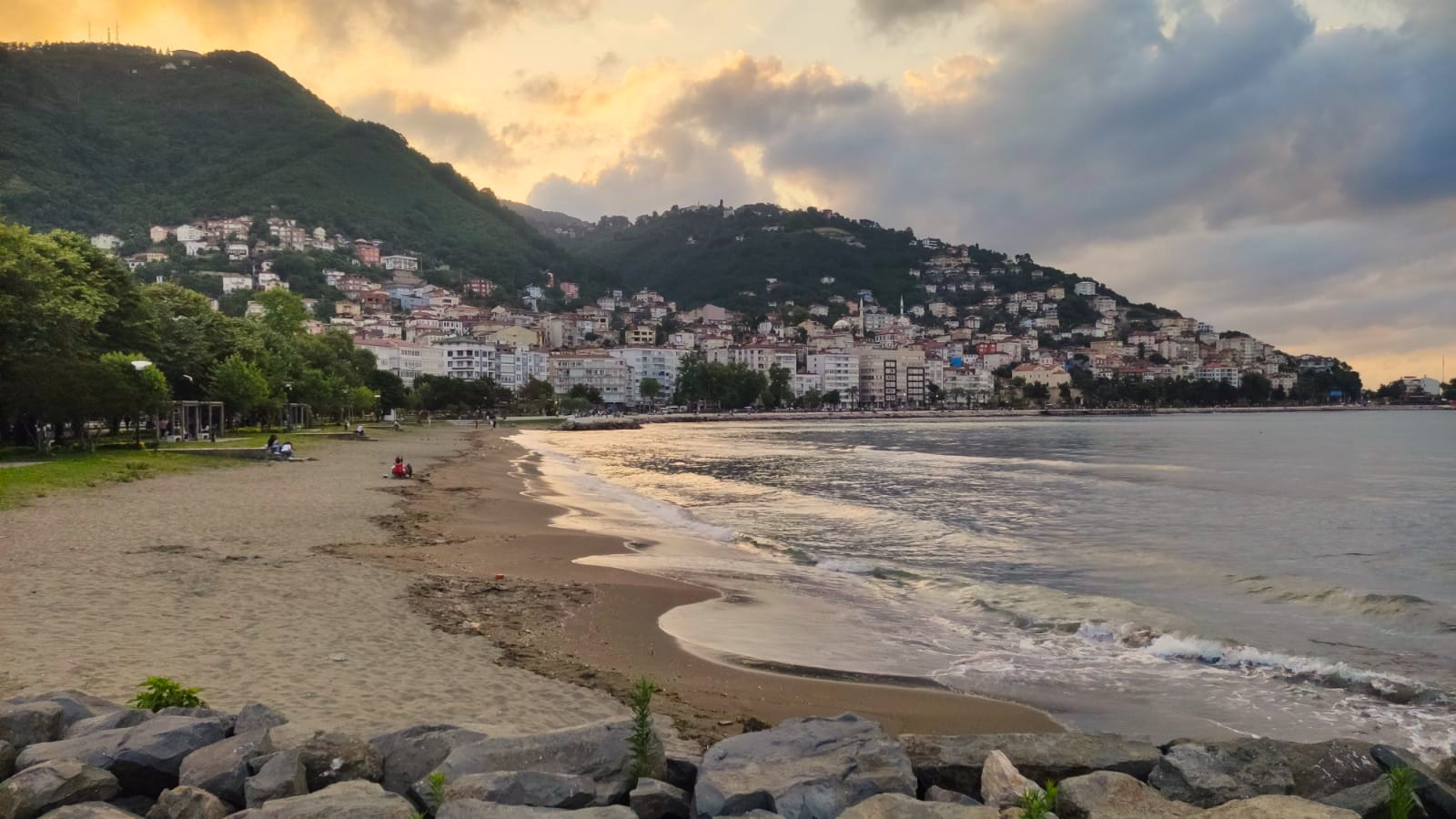
Coast of the Black Sea at Ordu

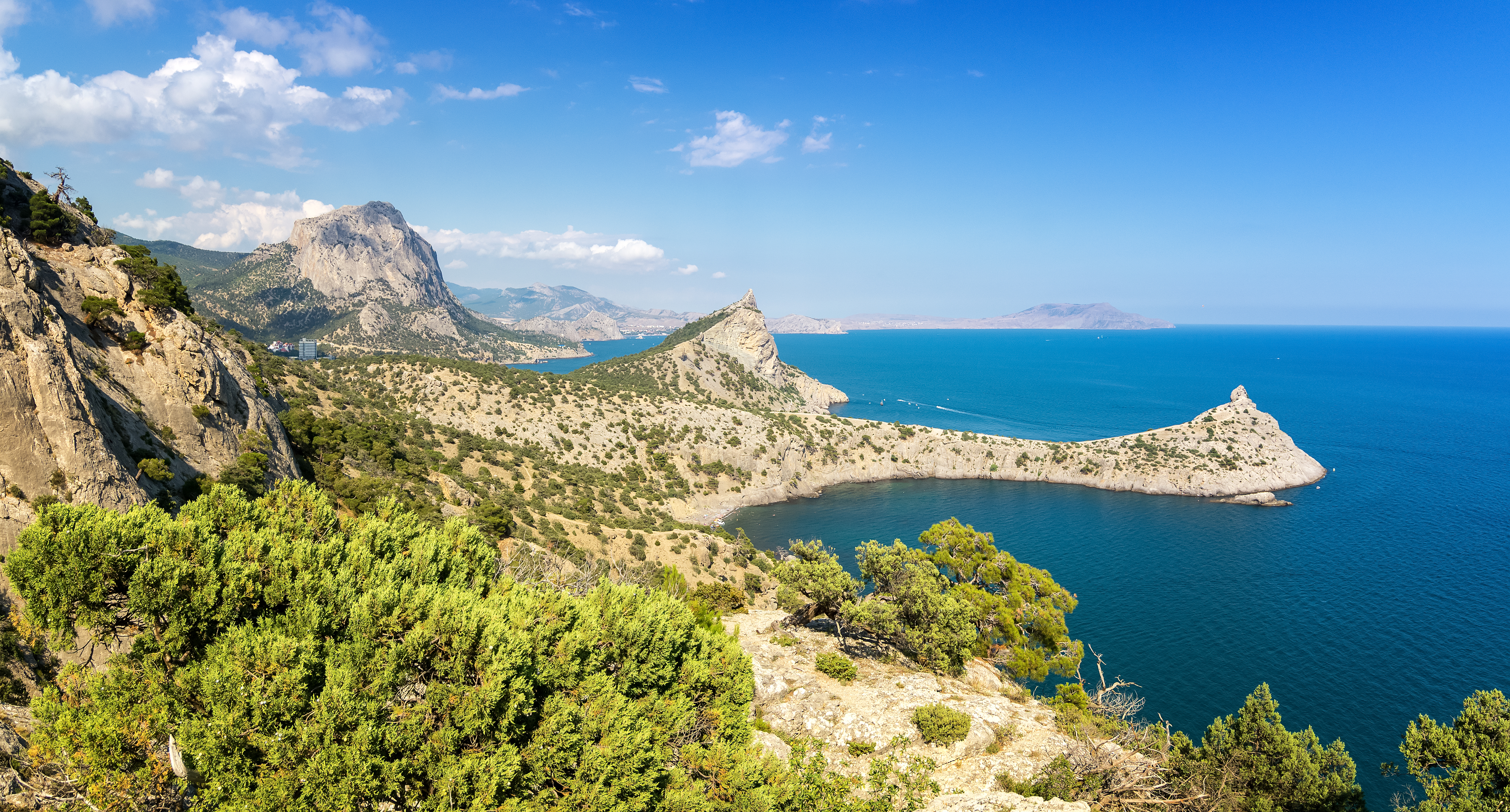
Kapchik Cape in Crimea

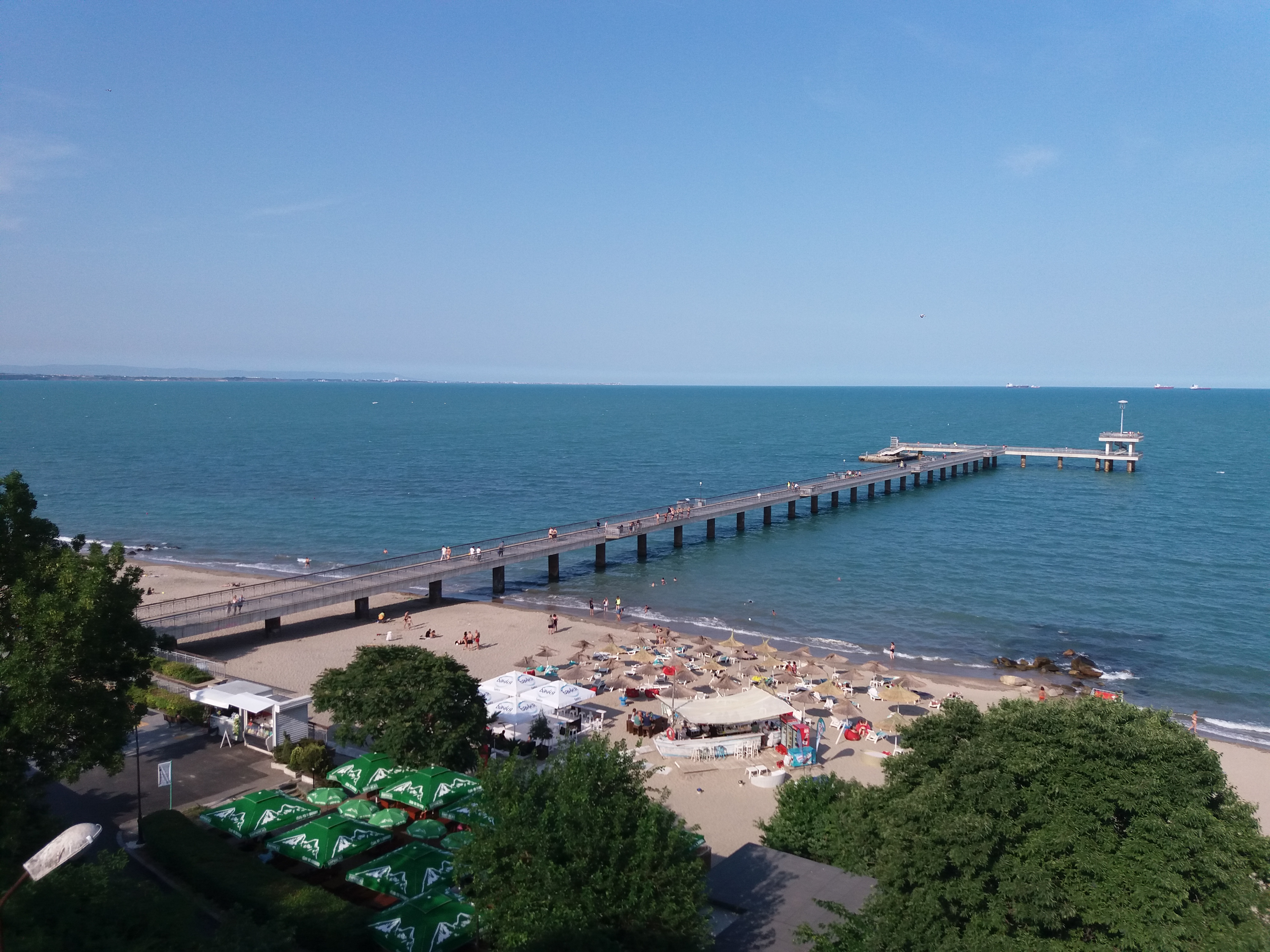
Coast of the Black Sea at Burgas

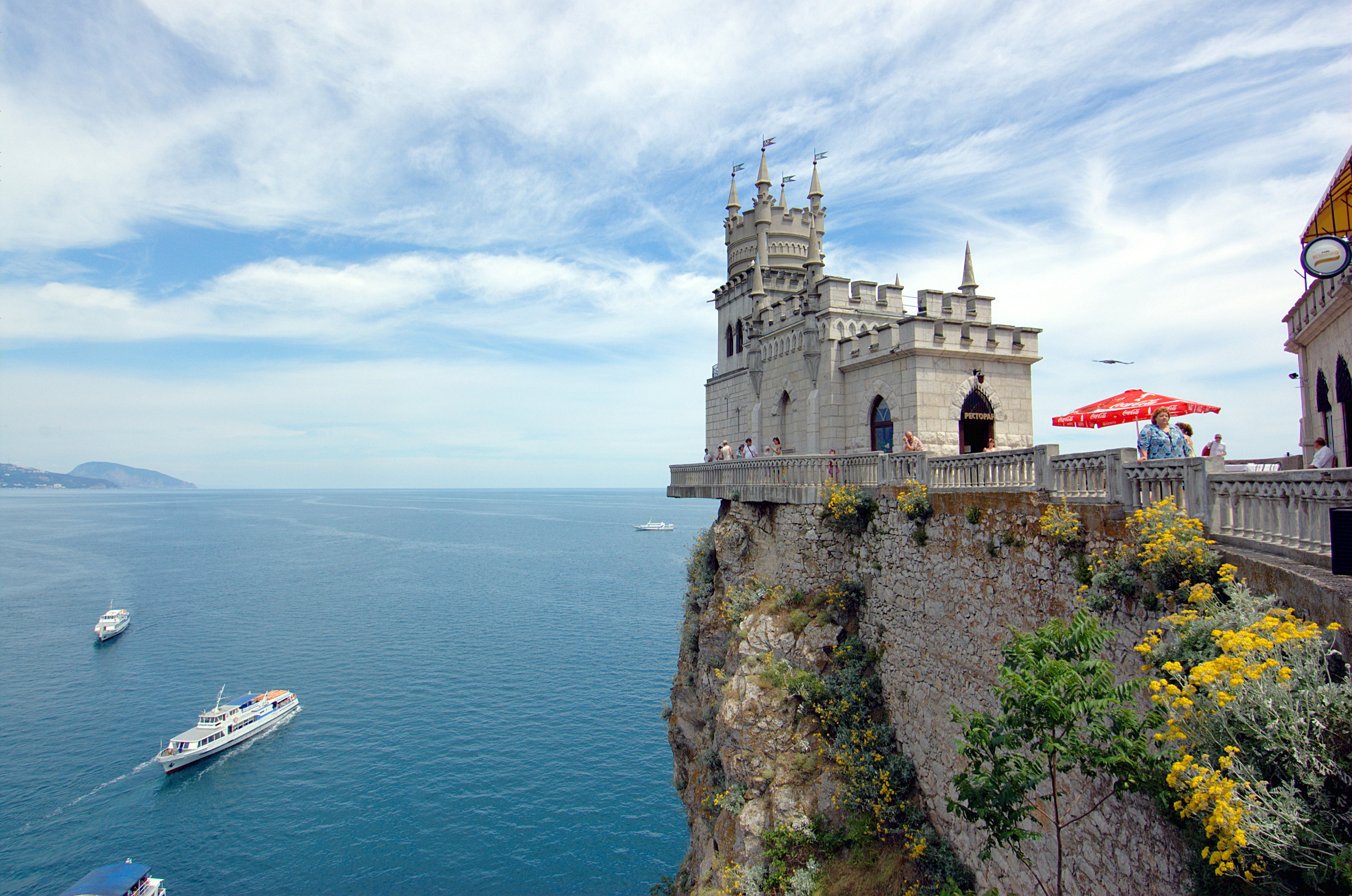
Swallow's Nest in Crimea

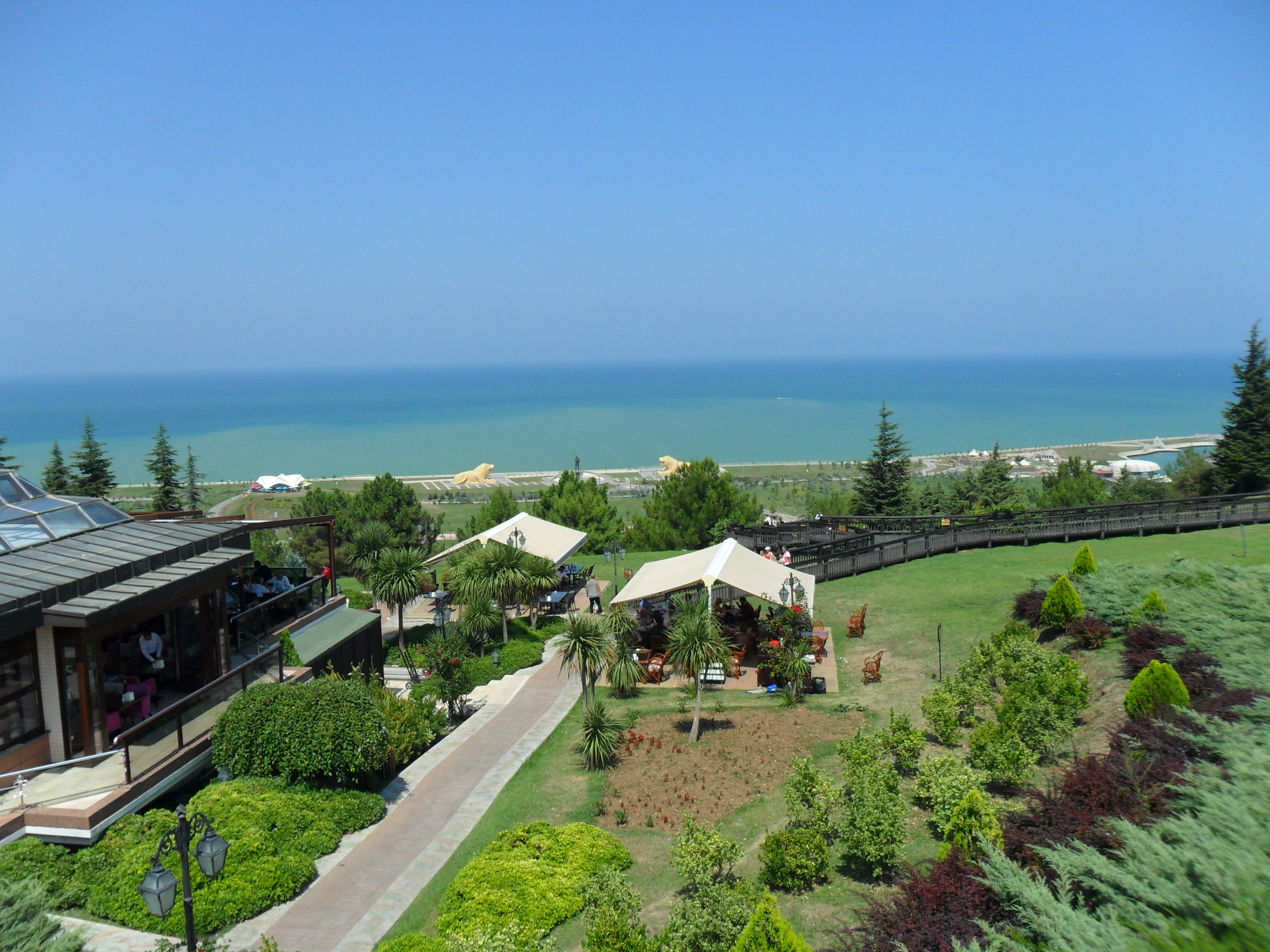
Coastline of Samsun in Turkey

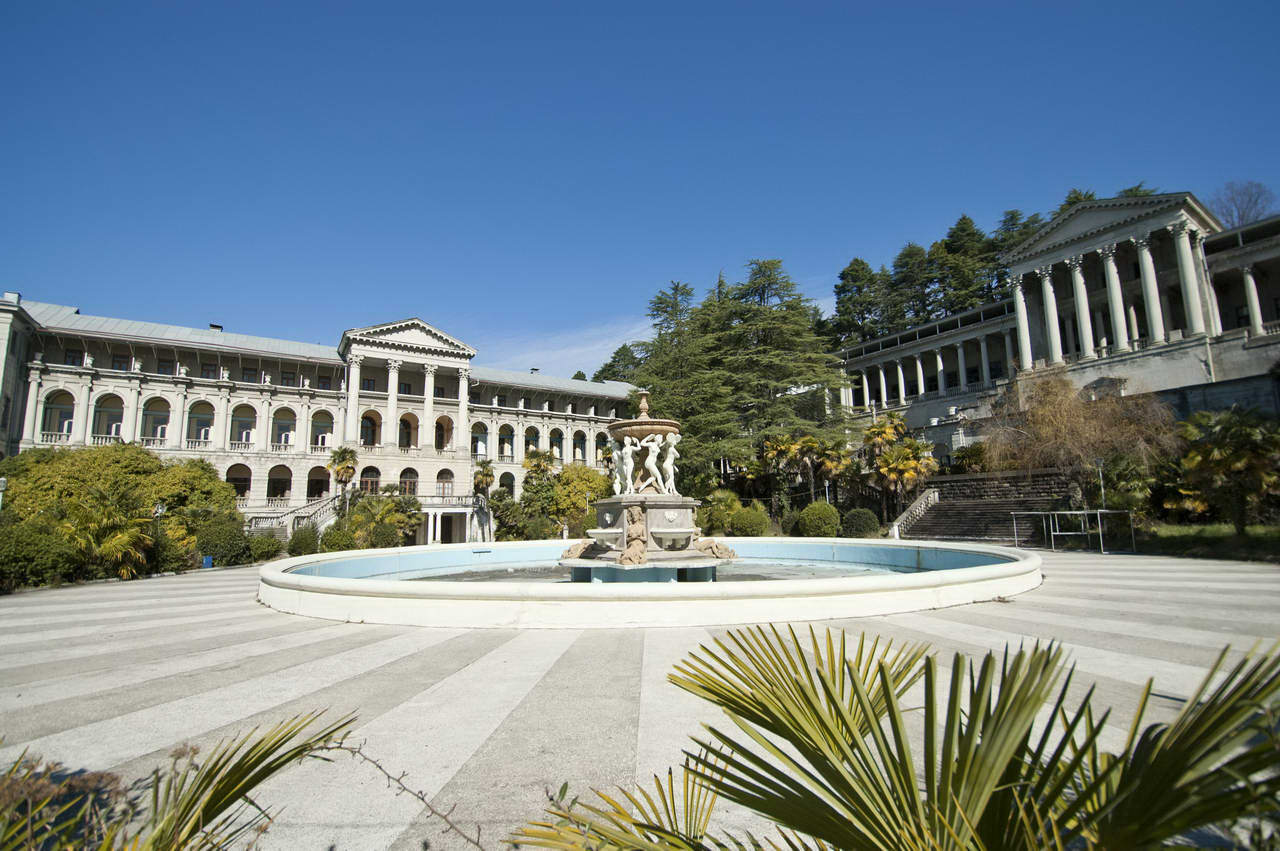
A sanatorium in Sochi, Russia

The International Hydrographic Organization defines the limits of the Black Sea as follows:

On the Southwest. The Northeastern limit of the Sea of Marmara [A line joining Cape Rumili with Cape Anatoli (41°13'N)]. In the Kertch Strait. A line joining Cape Takil and Cape Panaghia (45°02'N).

The area surrounding the Black Sea is commonly referred to as the Black Sea Region. Its northern part lies within the Chernozem belt (black soil belt) which goes from eastern Croatia (Slavonia), along the Danube (northern Serbia, northern Bulgaria (Danubian Plain) and southern Romania (Wallachian Plain) to northeast Ukraine and further across the Central Black Earth Region and southern Russia into Siberia.

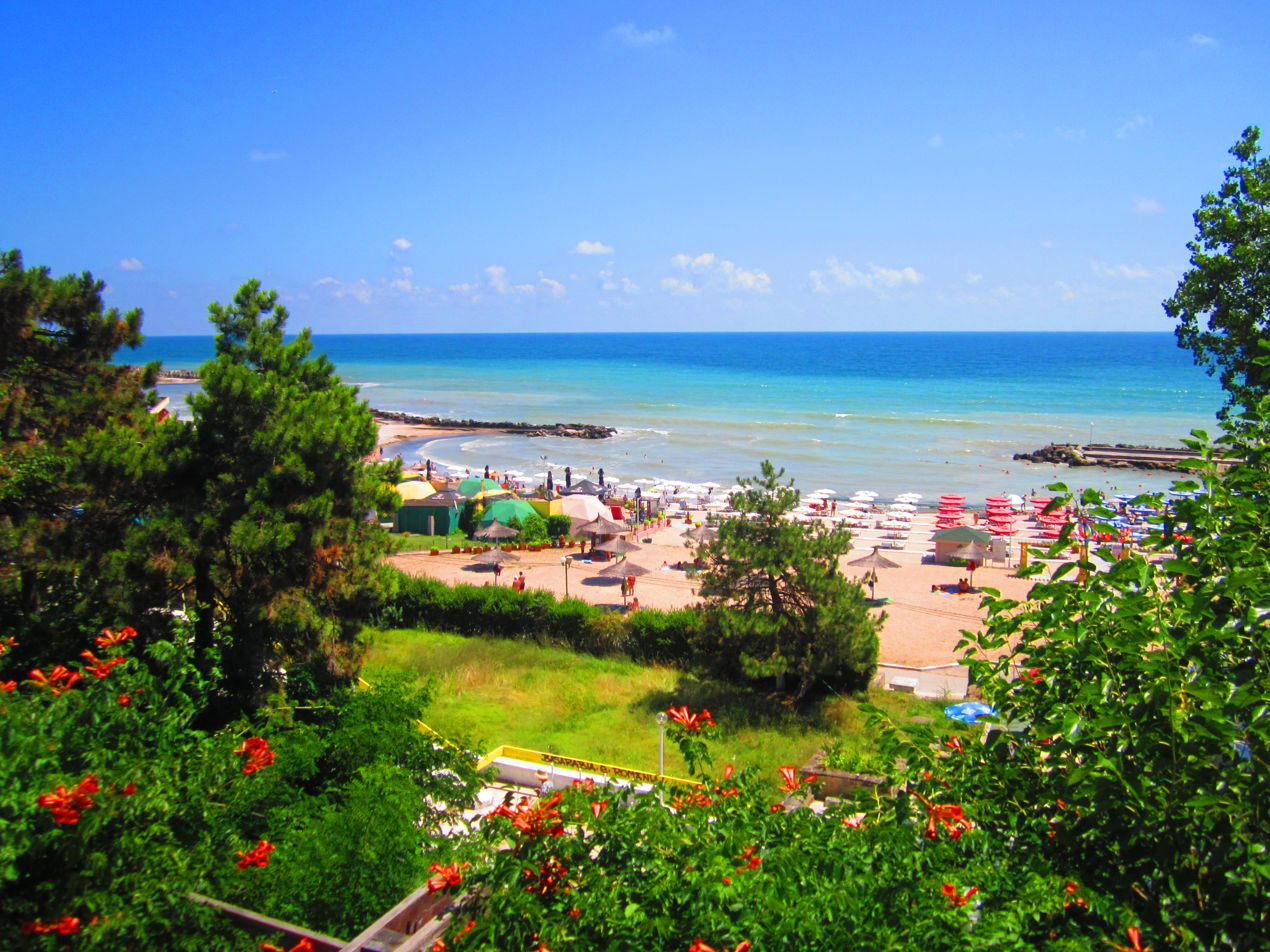
Coast of the Black Sea at Olimp

The littoral zone of the Black Sea is often referred to as the Pontic littoral or Pontic zone.

The largest bays of the Black Sea are Karkinit Bay in Ukraine; the Gulf of Burgas in Bulgaria; Dnieprovska Gulf and Dniestrovsky Liman, both in Ukraine; and Sinop Bay and Samsun Bay, both in Turkey.

=== Coastline and exclusive economic zones ===
Coastline length and area of exclusive economic zones
Country	Coastline length (km)	Exclusive economic zones area (km^{2})
Turkey	1,329	172,484
Ukraine	2,782	132,414
Russia	800	67,351
Bulgaria	354	35,132
Georgia	310 (without Abkhazia 100)	22,947
Romania	225	29,756
Abkhazia	210	–
Total	5,800	460,084

=== Drainage basin ===
The largest rivers flowing into the Black Sea are:

1. Danube
2. Dnieper
3. Don
4. Dniester
5. Kızılırmak
6. Kuban
7. Sakarya
8. Southern Bug
9. Çoruh/Chorokhi
10. Yeşilırmak
11. Rioni
12. Yeya
13. Mius
14. Kamchiya
15. Enguri/Egry
16. Kalmius
17. Molochna
18. Tylihul
19. Velykyi Kuialnyk
20. Veleka
21. Rezovo
22. Kodori/Kwydry
23. Bzyb/Bzipi
24. Supsa
25. Mzymta

These rivers and their tributaries comprise a 2-million km^{2} (0.77-million sq mi) Black Sea drainage basin that covers wholly or partially 24 countries:

- Albania
- Austria
- Belarus
- Bosnia and Herzegovina
- Bulgaria
- Croatia
- Czech Republic
- Georgia
- Germany
- Greece
- Hungary
- Italy
- Montenegro
- Moldova
- North Macedonia
- Poland
- Romania
- Russia
- Serbia
- Slovakia
- Slovenia
- Switzerland
- Turkey
- Ukraine

Unrecognized states:

- Abkhazia

=== Islands ===
Some islands in the Black Sea belong to Bulgaria, Romania, Turkey, and Ukraine:

- St. Thomas Island – Bulgaria
- St. Anastasia Island – Bulgaria
- St. Cyricus Island – Bulgaria
- St. Ivan Island – Bulgaria
- St. Peter Island – Bulgaria
- Sacalinu Mare Island – Romania
- Sacalinu Mic Island – Romania
- K Island – Romania and Ukraine
- Utrish Island
- Krupinin Island
- Sudiuk Island
- Kefken Island
- Oreke Island
- Giresun Island – Turkey
- Dzharylhach Island – Ukraine
- Zmiinyi (Snake) Island – Ukraine

=== Climate ===
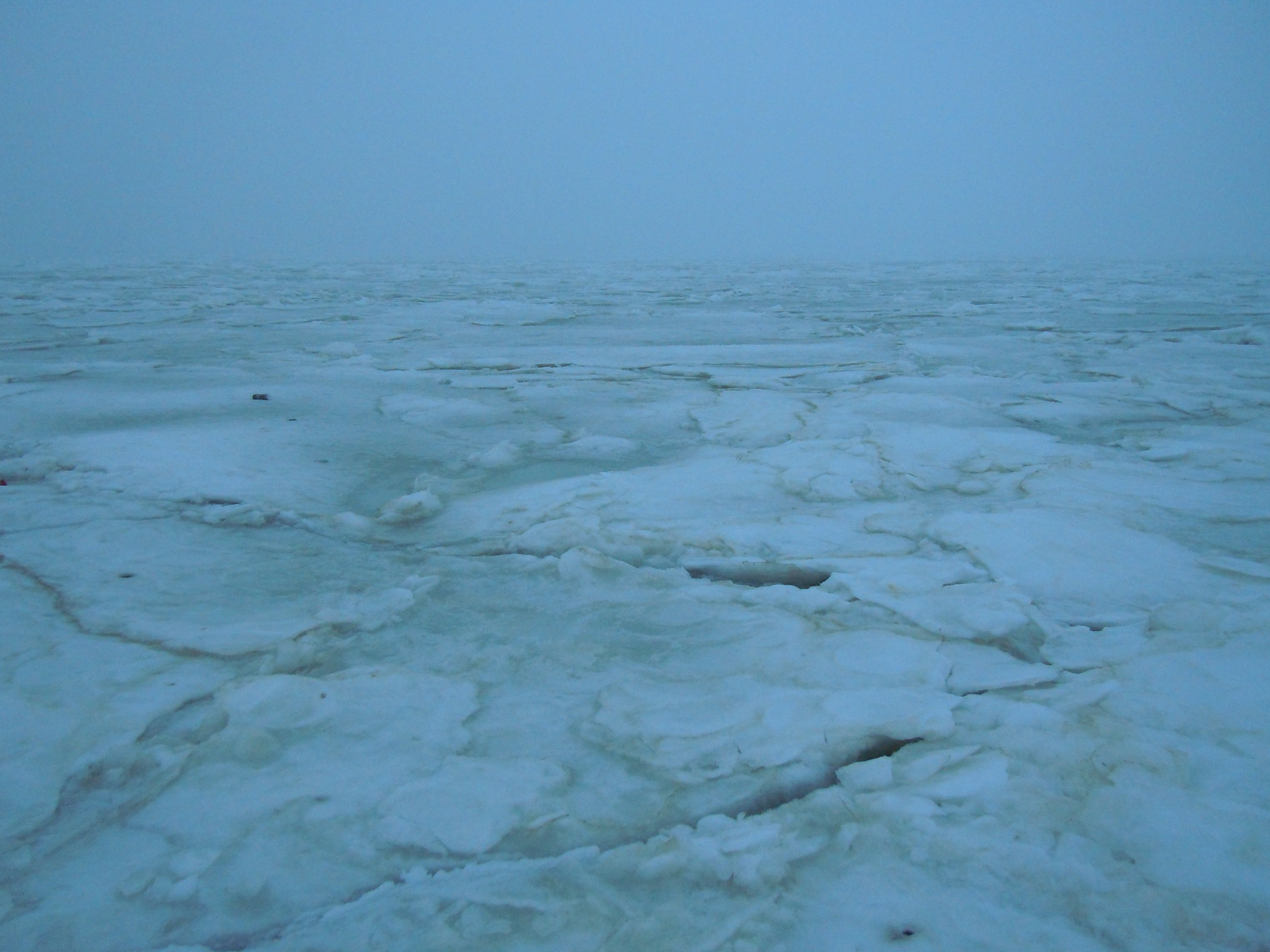
Ice on the Gulf of Odesa

Short-term climatic variation in the Black Sea region is significantly influenced by the operation of the North Atlantic oscillation, the climatic mechanisms resulting from the interaction between the north Atlantic and mid-latitude air masses. While the exact mechanisms causing the North Atlantic Oscillation remain unclear, it is thought the climate conditions established in western Europe mediate the heat and precipitation fluxes reaching Central Europe and Eurasia, regulating the formation of winter cyclones, which are largely responsible for regional precipitation inputs and influence Mediterranean sea surface temperatures (SSTs).

The relative strength of these systems also limits the amount of cold air arriving from northern regions during winter. Other influencing factors include the regional topography, as depressions and storm systems arriving from the Mediterranean are funneled through the low land around the Bosporus, with the Pontic and Caucasus mountain ranges acting as waveguides, limiting the speed and paths of cyclones passing through the region.

== Geology and bathymetry ==
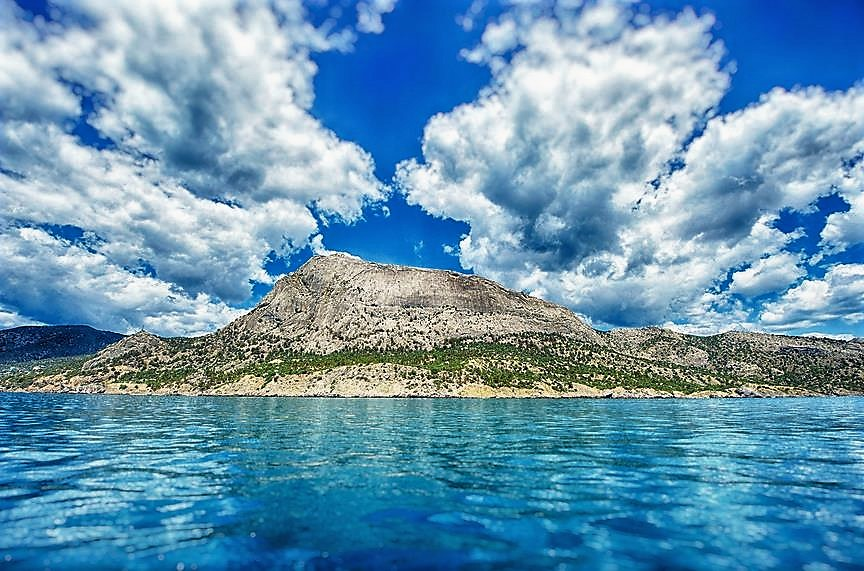
The bay of Sudak, Crimea

The Black Sea is divided into two depositional basins—the Western Black Sea and Eastern Black Sea—separated by the Mid-Black Sea High, which includes the Andrusov Ridge, Tetyaev High, and Archangelsky High, extending south from the Crimean Peninsula. The basin includes two distinct relict back-arc basins which were initiated by the splitting of an Albian volcanic arc and the subduction of both the Paleo- and Neo-Tethys oceans, but the timings of these events remain uncertain. Arc volcanism and extension occurred as the Neo-Tethys Ocean subducted under the southern margin of Laurasia during the Mesozoic. Uplift and compressional deformation took place as the Neotethys continued to close. Seismic surveys indicate that rifting began in the Western Black Sea in the Barremian and Aptian followed by the formation of oceanic crust 20 million years later in the Santonian. Since its initiation, compressional tectonic environments led to subsidence in the basin, interspersed with extensional phases resulting in large-scale volcanism and numerous orogenies, causing the uplift of the Greater Caucasus, Pontides, southern Crimean Peninsula and Balkanides mountain ranges.

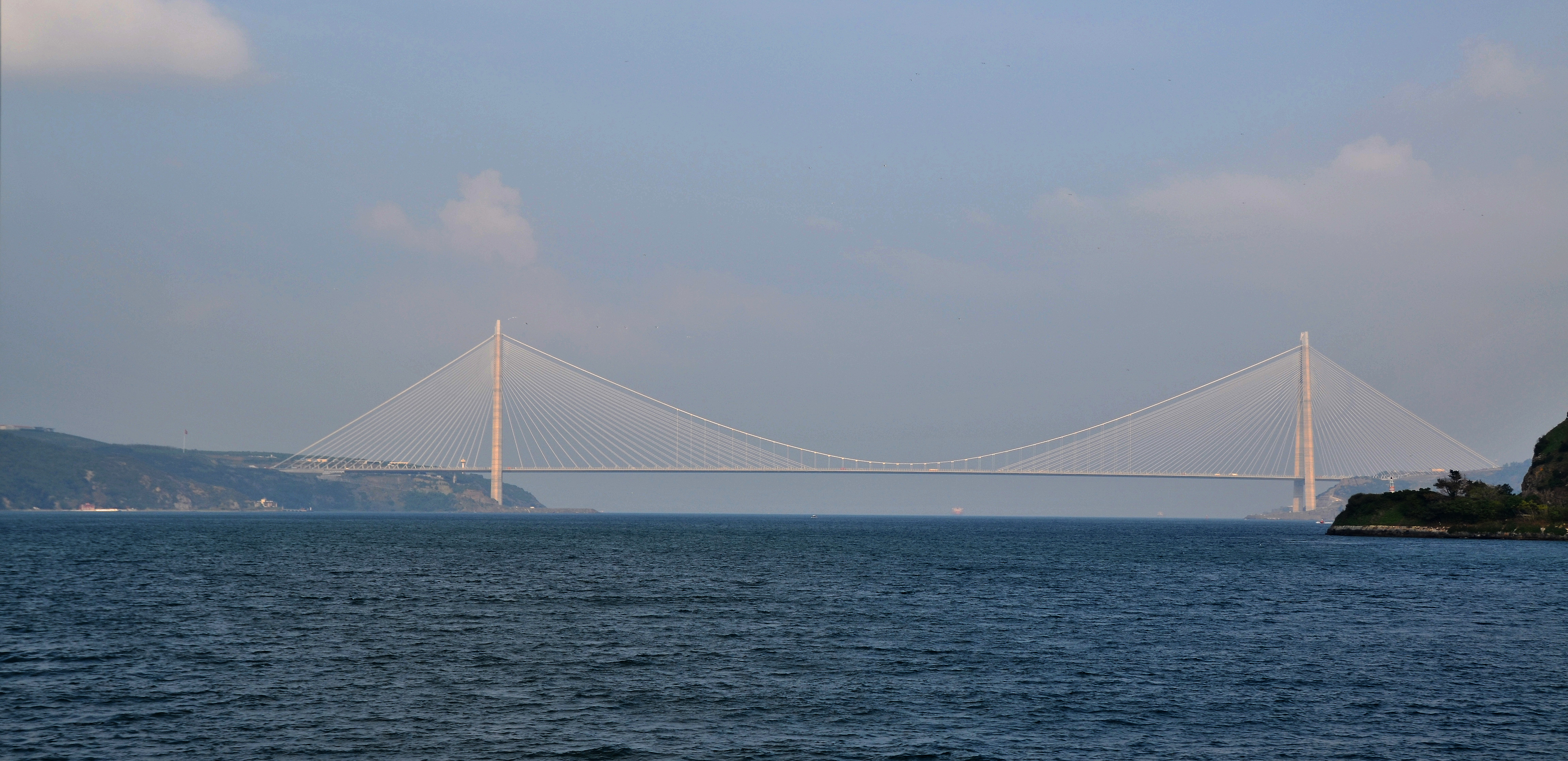
The Yavuz Sultan Selim Bridge in Istanbul, Turkey, crosses the Bosporus strait near its entrance to the Black Sea. Connecting Europe and Asia, it is one of the tallest suspension bridges in the world.

During the Messinian salinity crisis in the neighboring Mediterranean Sea, water levels fell but without drying up the sea. The collision between the Eurasian and African plates and the westward escape of the Anatolian block along the North Anatolian and East Anatolian faults dictates the current tectonic regime, which features enhanced subsidence in the Black Sea basin and significant volcanic activity in the Anatolian region. These geological mechanisms, in the long term, have caused the periodic isolations of the Black Sea from the rest of the global ocean system.

The large shelf to the north of the basin is up to 190 km (120 mi) wide and features a shallow apron with gradients between 1:40 and 1:1000. The southern edge around Turkey and the eastern edge around Georgia, however, are typified by a narrow shelf that rarely exceeds 20 km (12 mi) in width and a steep apron that is typically 1:40 gradient with numerous submarine canyons and channel extensions. The Euxine abyssal plain in the center of the Black Sea reaches a maximum depth of 2,212 metres (7,257.22 feet) just south of Yalta on the Crimean Peninsula.

=== Chronostratigraphy ===
The Paleo-Euxinian is described by the accumulation of eolian silt deposits (related to the Riss glaciation) and the lowering of sea levels (MIS 6, 8 and 10). The Karangat marine transgression occurred during the Eemian Interglacial (MIS 5e). This may have been the highest sea levels reached in the late Pleistocene. Based on this some scholars have suggested that the Crimean Peninsula was isolated from the mainland by a shallow strait during the Eemian Interglacial.

The Neoeuxinian transgression began with an inflow of waters from the Caspian Sea. Neoeuxinian deposits are found in the Black Sea below −20 m (−66 ft) water depth in three layers. The upper layers correspond with the peak of the Khvalinian transgression, on the shelf shallow-water sands and coquina mixed with silty sands and brackish-water fauna, and inside the Black Sea Depression hydrotroilite silts. The middle layers on the shelf are sands with brackish-water mollusc shells. Of continental origin, the lower level on the shelf is mostly alluvial sands with pebbles, mixed with less common lacustrine silts and freshwater mollusc shells. Inside the Black Sea Depression they are terrigenous non-carbonate silts, and at the foot of the continental slope turbidite sediments.

== Hydrology ==
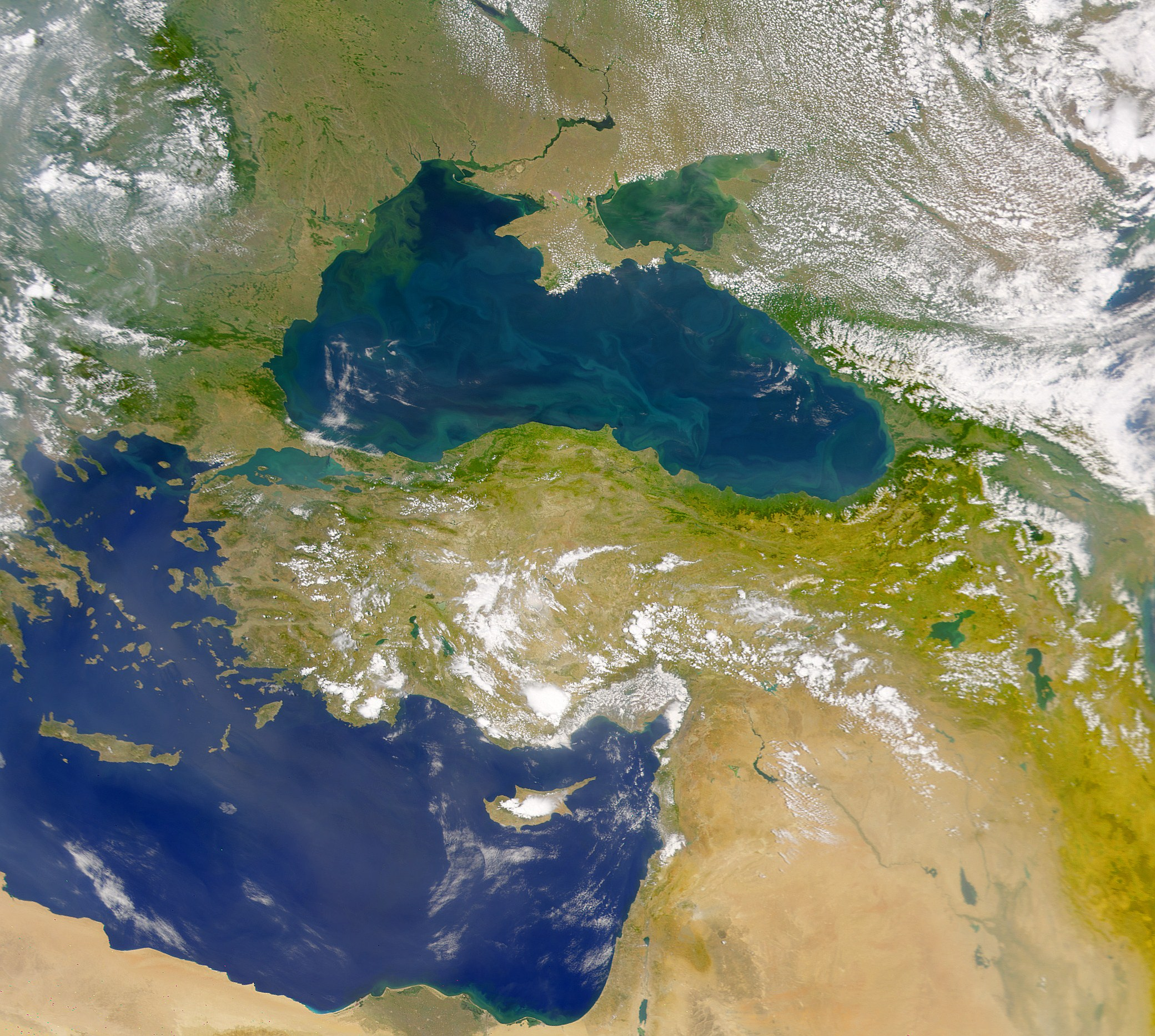
This SeaWiFS view reveals the currents on the sea's surface.

The Black Sea is the world's largest body of water with a meromictic basin. The deep waters do not mix with the upper layers of water that receive oxygen from the atmosphere. As a result, over 90% of the deeper Black Sea volume is anoxic water. The Black Sea's circulation patterns are primarily controlled by basin topography and fluvial inputs, which result in a strongly stratified vertical structure. Because of the extreme stratification, it is classified as a salt wedge estuary.

Inflow from the Mediterranean Sea through the Dardanelles and Bosporus has a higher salinity and density than the outflow, creating the classic estuarine circulation. This means that the inflow of dense water from the Mediterranean occurs at the bottom of the basin while the outflow of fresher Black Sea surface-water into the Sea of Marmara occurs near the surface. The outflow is 16,000 cubic metres per second (570,000 cubic feet per second) or around 500 cubic kilometres per year (120 cubic miles per year), and the inflow is 11,000 m^{3}/s (390,000 cu ft/s) or around 350 km^{3}/a (84 cu mi/a).

The following water budget can be estimated:

- Water in: 900 km^{3}/a (220 cu mi/a)
  - Total river discharge: 370 km^{3}/a (90 cu mi/a)
  - Precipitation: 180 km^{3}/a (40 cu mi/a)
  - Inflow via Bosporus: 350 km^{3}/a (80 cu mi/a)
- Water out: 900 km^{3}/a (220 cu mi/a)
  - Evaporation: 400 km^{3}/a (100 cu mi/a) (reduced greatly since the 1970s)
  - Outflow via Bosporus: 500 km^{3}/a (120 cu mi/a)

The southern sill of the Bosporus is located at 36.5 m (120 ft) below present sea level (deepest spot of the shallowest cross-section in the Bosporus, located in front of Dolmabahçe Palace) and has a wet section of around 38,000 m^{2} (410,000 sq ft). Inflow and outflow current speeds are averaged around 0.3 to 0.4 m/s (1.0 to 1.3 ft/s), but much higher speeds are found locally, inducing significant turbulence and vertical shear. This allows for turbulent mixing of the two layers. Surface water leaves the Black Sea with a salinity of 17 practical salinity units (PSU) and reaches the Mediterranean with a salinity of 34 PSU. Likewise, an inflow of the Mediterranean with salinity 38.5 PSU experiences a decrease to about 34 PSU.

Mean surface circulation is cyclonic; waters around the perimeter of the Black Sea circulate in a basin-wide shelfbreak gyre known as the Rim Current. The Rim Current has a maximum velocity of about 50–100 cm/s (20–39 in/s). Within this feature, two smaller cyclonic gyres operate, occupying the eastern and western sectors of the basin. The Eastern and Western Gyres are well-organized systems in the winter but dissipate into a series of interconnected eddies in the summer and autumn. Mesoscale activity in the peripheral flow becomes more pronounced during these warmer seasons and is subject to interannual variability.

Outside of the Rim Current, numerous quasi-permanent coastal eddies are formed as a result of upwelling around the coastal apron and "wind curl" mechanisms. The intra-annual strength of these features is controlled by seasonal atmospheric and fluvial variations. During the spring, the Batumi eddy forms in the southeastern corner of the sea.

Beneath the surface waters—from about 50 to 100 metres (160 to 330 ft)—there exists a halocline that stops at the Cold Intermediate Layer (CIL). This layer is composed of cool, salty surface waters, which are the result of localized atmospheric cooling and decreased fluvial input during the winter months. It is the remnant of the winter surface mixed layer. The base of the CIL is marked by a major pycnocline at about 100–200 metres (330–660 ft), and this density disparity is the major mechanism for isolation of the deep water.

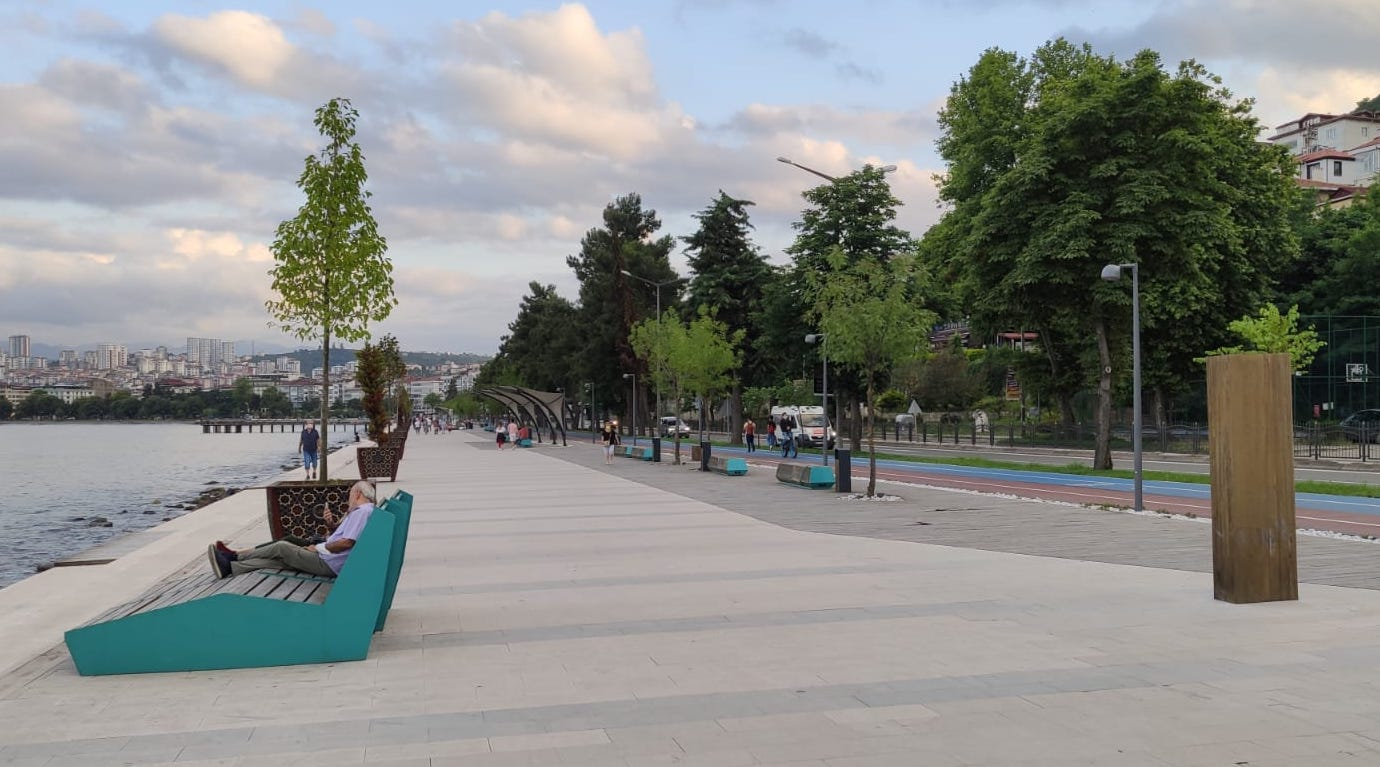
Black Sea coast in Ordu, Turkey

Below the pycnocline is the Deep Water mass, where salinity increases to 22.3 PSU and temperatures rise to around 8.9 °C (48.0 °F). The hydrochemical environment shifts from oxygenated to anoxic, as bacterial decomposition of sunken biomass utilizes all of the free oxygen. Weak geothermal heating and long residence time create a very thick convective bottom layer.

The Black Sea undersea river is a current of particularly saline water flowing through the Bosporus Strait and along the seabed of the Black Sea. The discovery of the river, announced on 1 August 2010, was made by scientists at the University of Leeds and is the first of its kind to be identified. The undersea river stems from salty water spilling through the Bosporus Strait from the Mediterranean Sea into the Black Sea, where the water has a lower salt content.

== Hydrochemistry ==
Because of the anoxic water at depth, organic matter, including anthropogenic artifacts such as boat hulls, are well preserved. During periods of high surface productivity, short-lived algal blooms form organic rich layers known as sapropels. Scientists have reported an annual phytoplankton bloom that can be seen in many NASA images of the region. As a result of these characteristics the Black Sea has gained interest from the field of marine archaeology, as ancient shipwrecks in excellent states of preservation have been discovered, such as the Byzantine wreck Sinop D, located in the anoxic layer off the coast of Sinop, Turkey.

Modelling shows that, in the event of an asteroid impact on the Black Sea, the release of hydrogen sulfide clouds would pose a threat to health—and perhaps even life—for people living on the Black Sea coast.

There have been isolated reports of flares on the Black Sea occurring during thunderstorms, possibly caused by lightning igniting combustible gas seeping up from the sea depths.

== Ecology ==
=== Marine ===
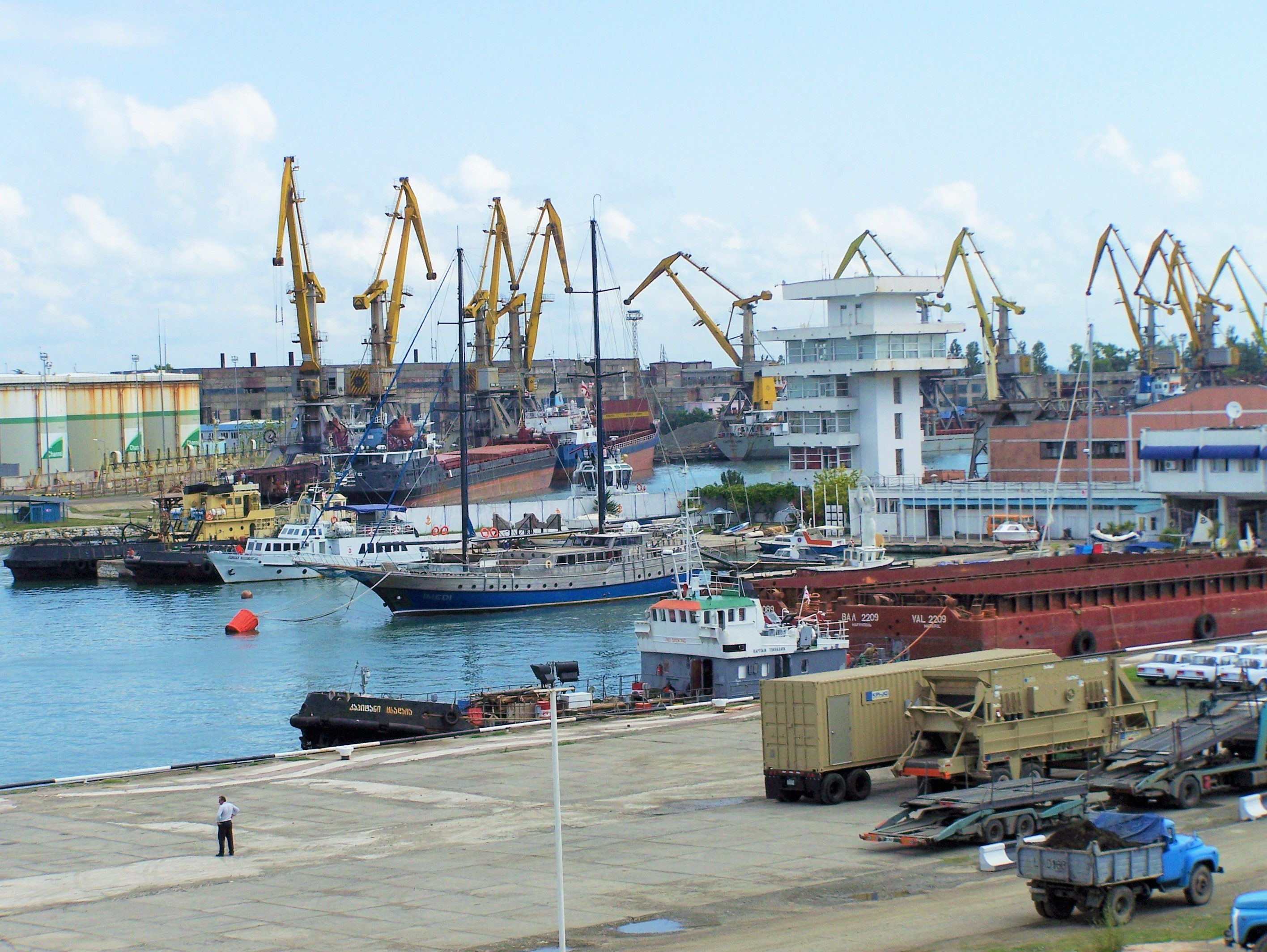
The port of Poti, Georgia

The Black Sea supports an active and dynamic marine ecosystem, dominated by species suited to the brackish, nutrient-rich, conditions. As with all marine food webs, the Black Sea features a range of trophic groups, with autotrophic algae, including diatoms and dinoflagellates, acting as primary producers. The fluvial systems draining Eurasia and central Europe introduce large volumes of sediment and dissolved nutrients into the Black Sea, but the distribution of these nutrients is controlled by the degree of physiochemical stratification, which is, in turn, dictated by seasonal physiographic development.

During winter, strong winds promote convective overturning and upwelling of nutrients, while high summer temperatures result in marked vertical stratification and a warm, shallow mixed layer. Day length and insolation intensity also control the extent of the photic zone. Subsurface productivity is limited by nutrient availability, as the anoxic bottom waters act as a sink for reduced nitrate, in the form of ammonia. The benthic zone also plays an important role in Black Sea nutrient cycling, as chemosynthetic organisms and anoxic geochemical pathways recycle nutrients which can be upwelled to the photic zone, enhancing productivity.

In total, the Black Sea's biodiversity contains around one-third of the Mediterranean's and is experiencing natural and artificial invasions or "Mediterranizations".

==== Phytoplankton ====
Phytoplankton blooms and plumes of sediment form the bright blue swirls that ring the Black Sea in this 2012 image.

The main phytoplankton groups present in the Black Sea are dinoflagellates, diatoms, coccolithophores and cyanobacteria. Generally, the annual cycle of phytoplankton development comprises significant diatom and dinoflagellate-dominated spring production, followed by a weaker mixed assemblage of community development below the seasonal thermocline during summer months, and surface-intensified autumn production. This pattern of productivity is augmented by an Emiliania huxleyi bloom during the late spring and summer months.

- Dinoflagellates

Annual dinoflagellate distribution is defined by an extended bloom period in subsurface waters during the late spring and summer. In November, subsurface plankton production is combined with surface production, due to vertical mixing of water masses and nutrients such as nitrite. The major bloom-forming dinoflagellate species in the Black Sea is Gymnodinium sp. Estimates of dinoflagellate diversity in the Black Sea range from 193 to 267 species. This level of species richness is relatively low in comparison to the Mediterranean Sea, which is attributable to the brackish conditions, low water transparency and presence of anoxic bottom waters. It is also possible that the low winter temperatures below 4 °C (39 °F) of the Black Sea prevent thermophilous species from becoming established. The relatively high organic matter content of Black Sea surface water favors the development of heterotrophic (an organism that uses organic carbon for growth) and mixotrophic dinoflagellates species (able to exploit different trophic pathways), relative to autotrophs. Despite its unique hydrographic setting, there are no confirmed endemic dinoflagellate species in the Black Sea.

- Diatoms

The Black Sea is populated by many species of the marine diatom, which commonly exist as colonies of unicellular, non-motile auto- and heterotrophic algae. The life-cycle of most diatoms can be described as 'boom and bust' and the Black Sea is no exception, with diatom blooms occurring in surface waters throughout the year, most reliably during March. In simple terms, the phase of rapid population growth in diatoms is caused by the in-wash of silicon-bearing terrestrial sediments, and when the supply of silicon is exhausted, the diatoms begin to sink out of the photic zone and produce resting cysts. Additional factors such as predation by zooplankton and ammonium-based regenerated production also have a role to play in the annual diatom cycle. Typically, Proboscia alata blooms during spring and Pseudosolenia calcar-avis blooms during the autumn.

- Coccolithophores

Coccolithophores are a type of motile, autotrophic phytoplankton that produce CaCO_{3} plates, known as coccoliths, as part of their life cycle. In the Black Sea, the main period of coccolithophore growth occurs after the bulk of the dinoflagellate growth has taken place. In May, the dinoflagellates move below the seasonal thermocline into deeper waters, where more nutrients are available. This permits coccolithophores to utilize the nutrients in the upper waters, and by the end of May, with favorable light and temperature conditions, growth rates reach their highest. The major bloom-forming species is Emiliania huxleyi, which is also responsible for the release of dimethyl sulfide into the atmosphere. Overall, coccolithophore diversity is low in the Black Sea, and although recent sediments are dominated by E. huxleyi and Braarudosphaera bigelowii, Holocene sediments have been shown to also contain Helicopondosphaera and Discolithina species.

- Cyanobacteria

Cyanobacteria are a phylum of picoplanktonic (plankton ranging in size from 0.2 to 2.0 μm) bacteria that obtain their energy via photosynthesis, and are present throughout the world's oceans. They exhibit a range of morphologies, including filamentous colonies and biofilms. In the Black Sea, several species are present, and as an example, Synechococcus spp. can be found throughout the photic zone, although concentration decreases with increasing depth. Other factors which exert an influence on distribution include nutrient availability, predation, and salinity.

==== Animal species ====
- Zebra mussel

The Black Sea along with the Caspian Sea is part of the zebra mussel's native range. The mussel has been accidentally introduced around the world and become an invasive species where it has been introduced.

- Common carp

The common carp's native range extends to the Black Sea along with the Caspian Sea and Aral Sea. Like the zebra mussel, the common carp is an invasive species when introduced to other habitats.

- Round goby

Another native fish that is also found in the Caspian Sea. It preys upon zebra mussels. Like the mussels and common carp, it has become invasive when introduced to other environments, like the Great Lakes in North America.

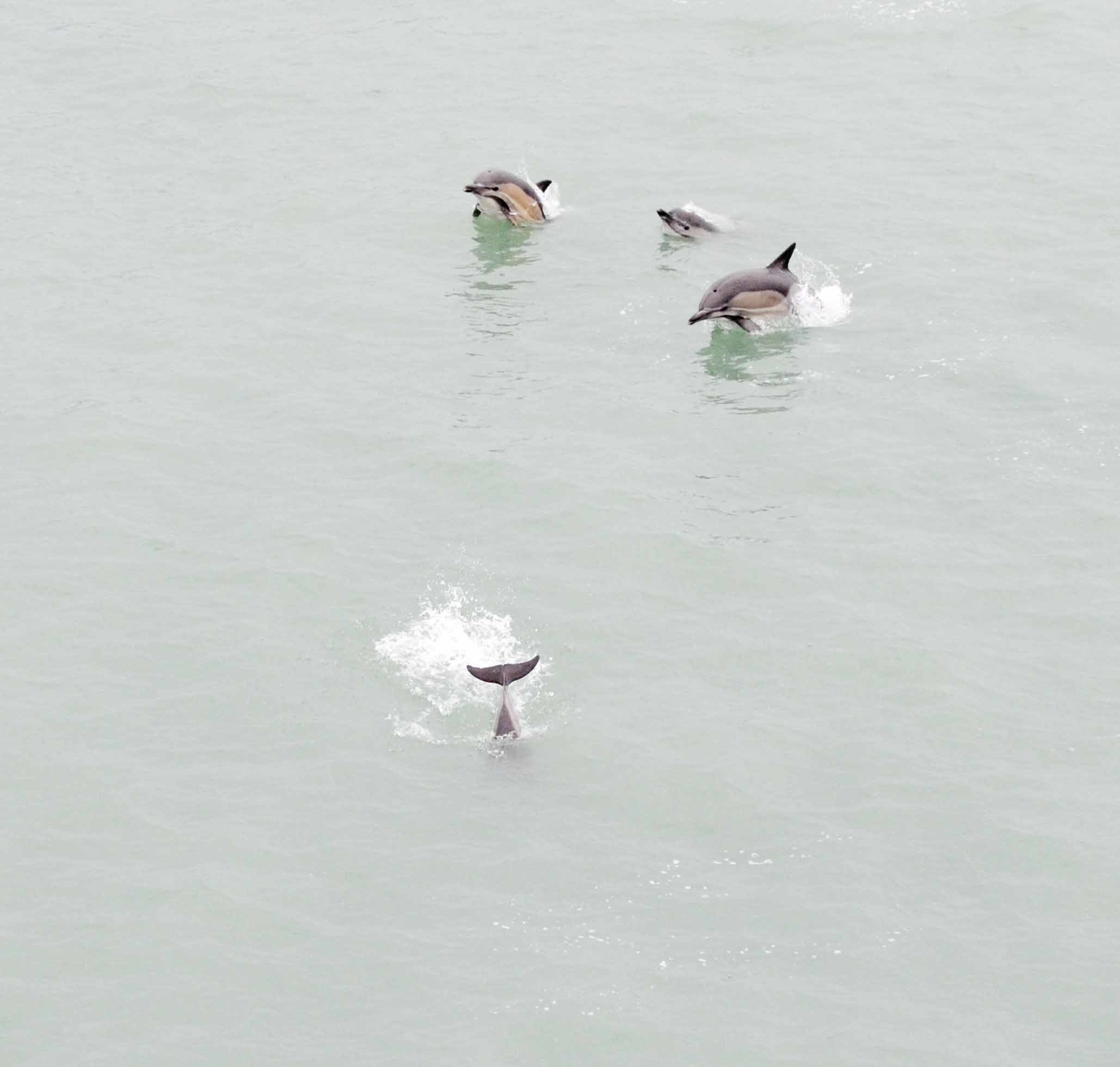
- Common dolphins porpoising with a ferry at Batumi port
  Marine mammals and marine megafauna

Marine mammals present within the basin include subspecies of two species of dolphin (common and bottlenose) and the harbour porpoise, although all of these are endangered due to pressures and impacts by human activities. All three species have been classified as distinct subspecies from those in the Mediterranean and the Atlantic and are endemic to the Black and Azov seas, and are more active during nights in the Turkish Straits. However, construction of the Crimean Bridge has caused increases in nutrients and planktons in the waters, attracting large numbers of fish and more than 1,000 bottlenose dolphins. However, others claim that construction may cause devastating damages to the ecosystem, including dolphins.
Mediterranean monk seals, now a vulnerable species, were historically abundant in the Black Sea, and are regarded to have become extinct from the basin in 1997. Monk seals were present at Snake Island, near the Danube Delta, until the 1950s, and several locations such as the Danube Plavni Nature Reserve and Doğankent were the last of the seals' hauling-out sites post-1990. Very few animals still thrive in the Sea of Marmara.
Ongoing Mediterranizations may or may not boost cetacean diversity in the Turkish Straits and hence in the Black and Azov basins.
Various species of pinnipeds, sea otter, and beluga whale were introduced into the Black Sea by mankind and later escaped either by accidental or purported causes. Of these, grey seals and beluga whales have been recorded with successful, long-term occurrences.
Great white sharks are known to reach into the Sea of Marmara and Bosporus Strait and basking sharks into the Dardanelles, although it is unclear whether or not these sharks may reach into the Black and Azov basins.

==== Ecological effects of pollution ====
Since the 1960s, rapid industrial expansion along the Black Sea coastline and the construction of a major dam on the Danube have significantly increased annual variability in the N:P:Si ratio in the basin. Coastal areas, accordingly, have seen an increase in the frequency of monospecific phytoplankton blooms, with diatom-bloom frequency increasing by a factor of 2.5 and non-diatom bloom frequency increasing by a factor of 6. The non-diatoms, such as the prymnesiophytes Emiliania huxleyi (coccolithophore), Chromulina sp., and the Euglenophyte Eutreptia lanowii, can out-compete diatom species because of the limited availability of silicon, a necessary constituent of diatom frustules. As a consequence of these blooms, benthic macrophyte populations were deprived of light, while anoxia caused mass mortality in marine animals.

Overfishing during the 1970s further compounded the decline in macrophytes, while the invasive ctenophore Mnemiopsis reduced the biomass of copepods and other zooplankton in the late 1980s. Additionally, an alien species—the warty comb jelly (Mnemiopsis leidyi)—established itself in the basin, exploding from a few individuals to an estimated biomass of one billion metric tons.

Pollution-reduction and regulation efforts led to a partial recovery of the Black Sea ecosystem during the 1990s, and an EU monitoring exercise, 'EROS21', revealed decreased nitrogen and phosphorus values relative to the 1989 peak. Recently, scientists have noted signs of ecological recovery, in part due to the construction of new sewage-treatment plants in Slovakia, Hungary, Romania, and Bulgaria in connection with those countries' membership of the European Union. Mnemiopsis leidyi populations have been checked with the arrival of another alien species that feeds on them. However other sources say that there was ecological decline in the early 21st century.

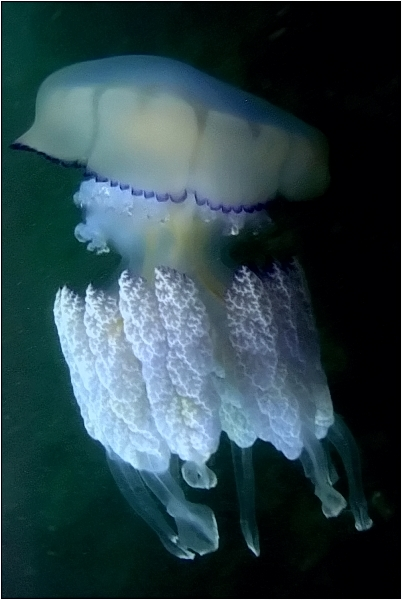
Jellyfish

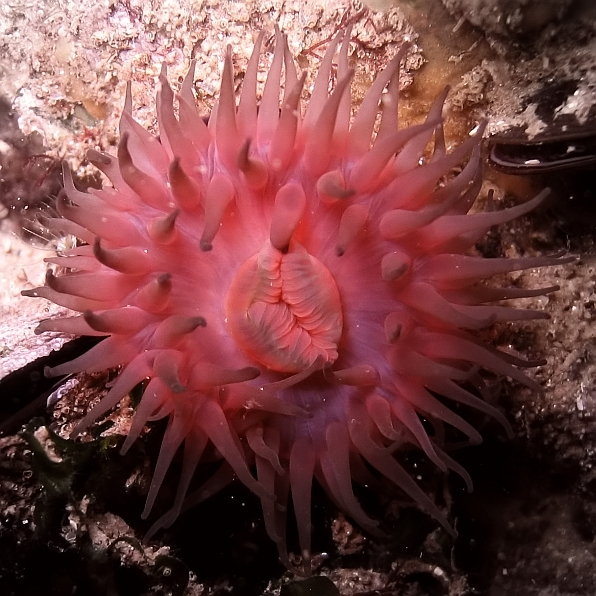
Actinia

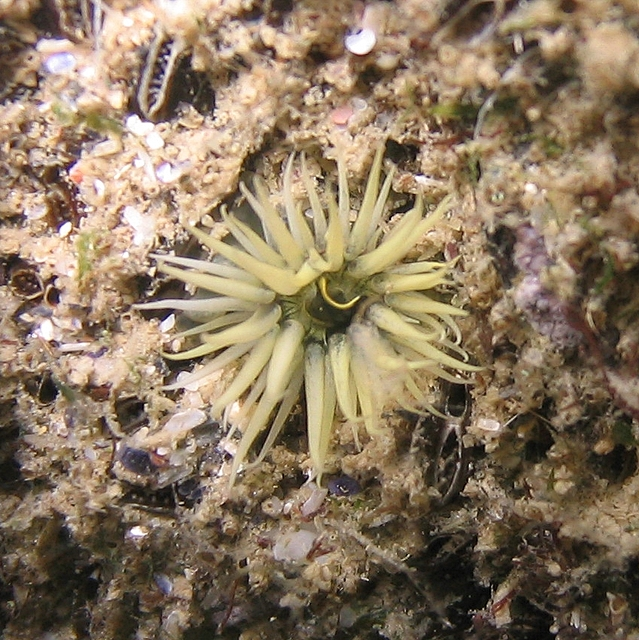
Actinia

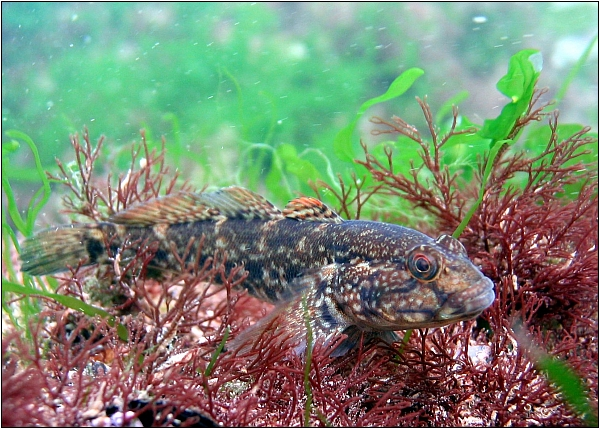
Goby

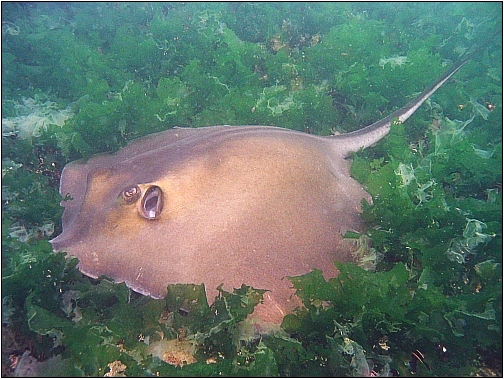
Stingray

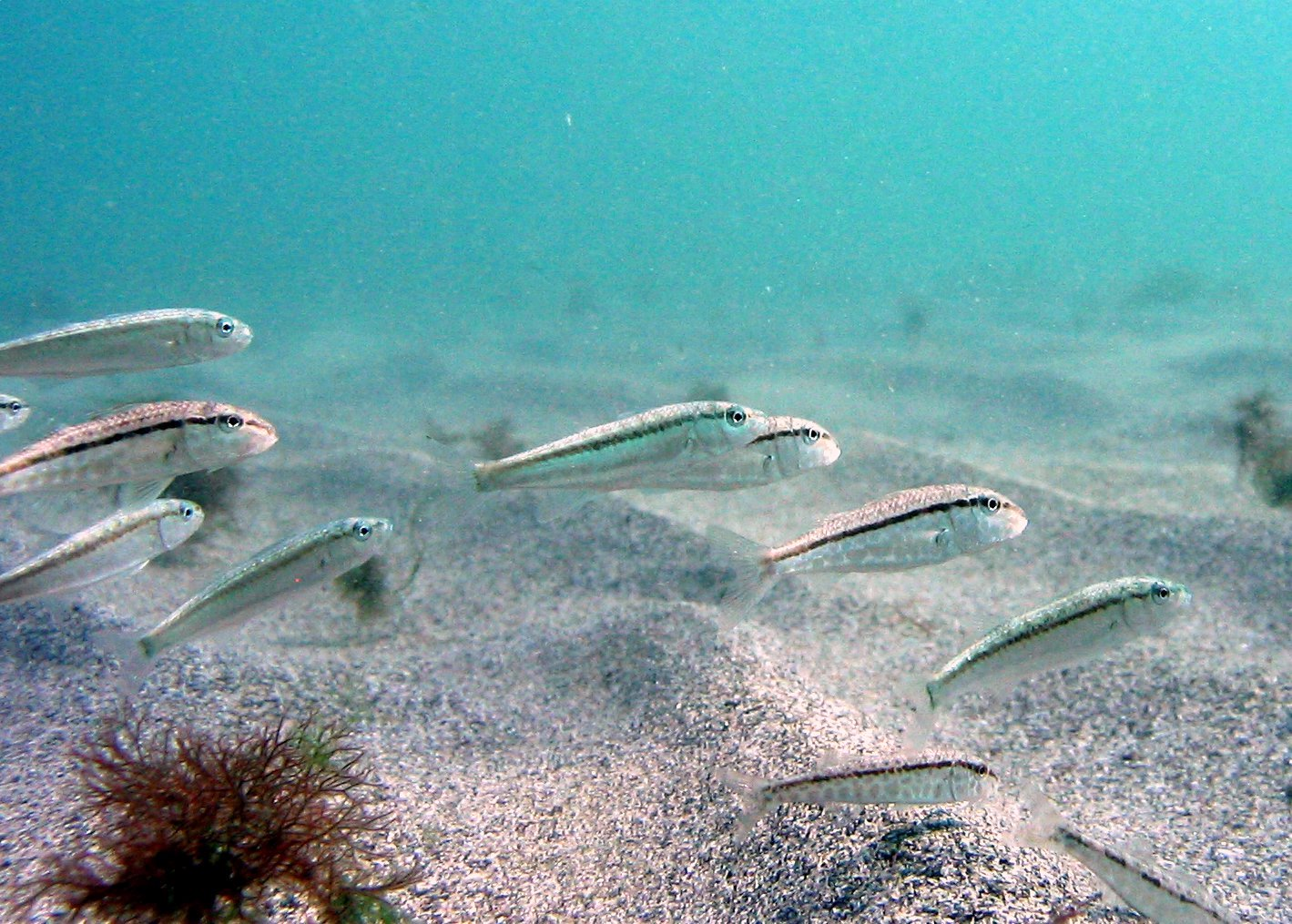
Goat fish

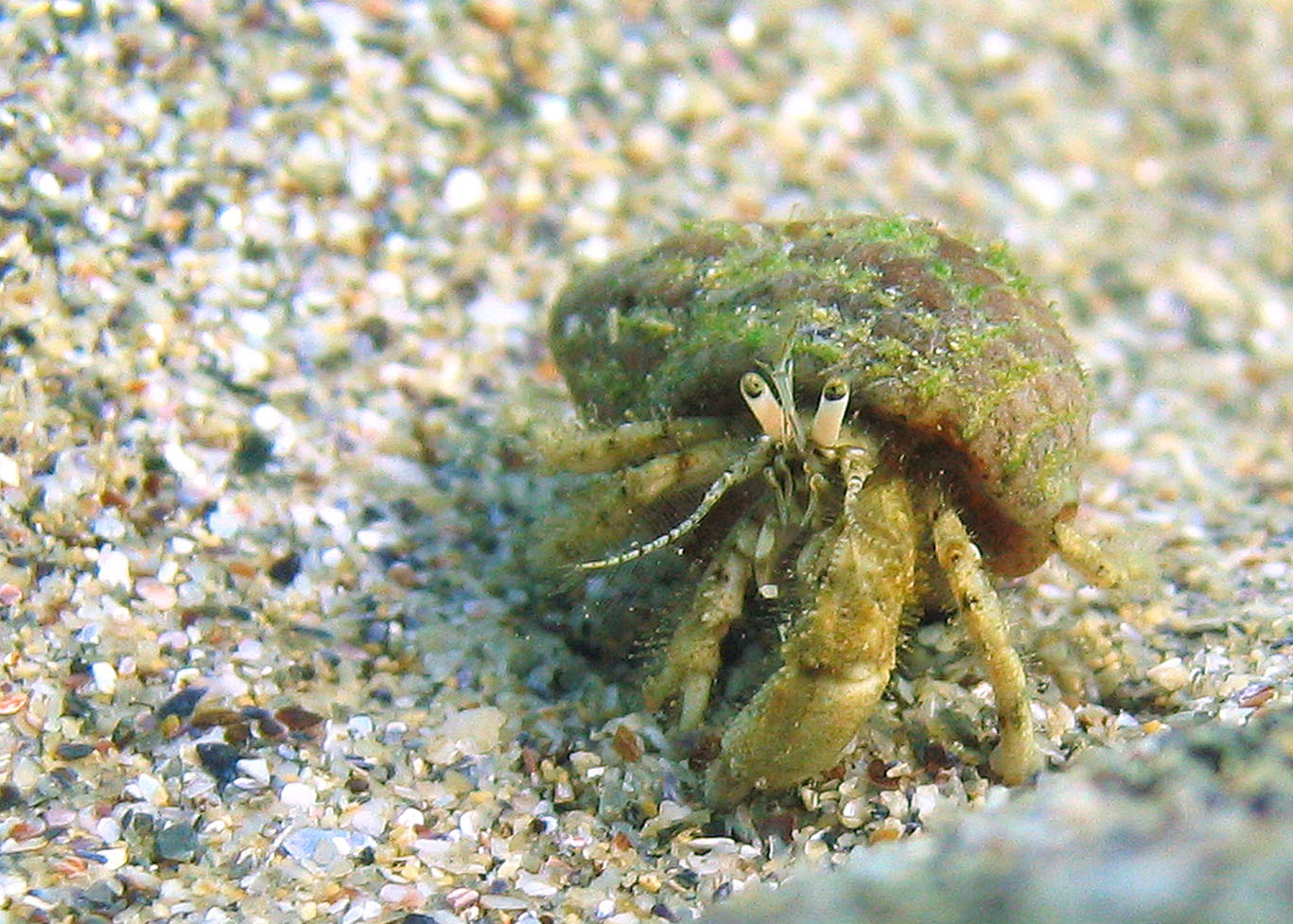
Hermit crab, Diogenes pugilator

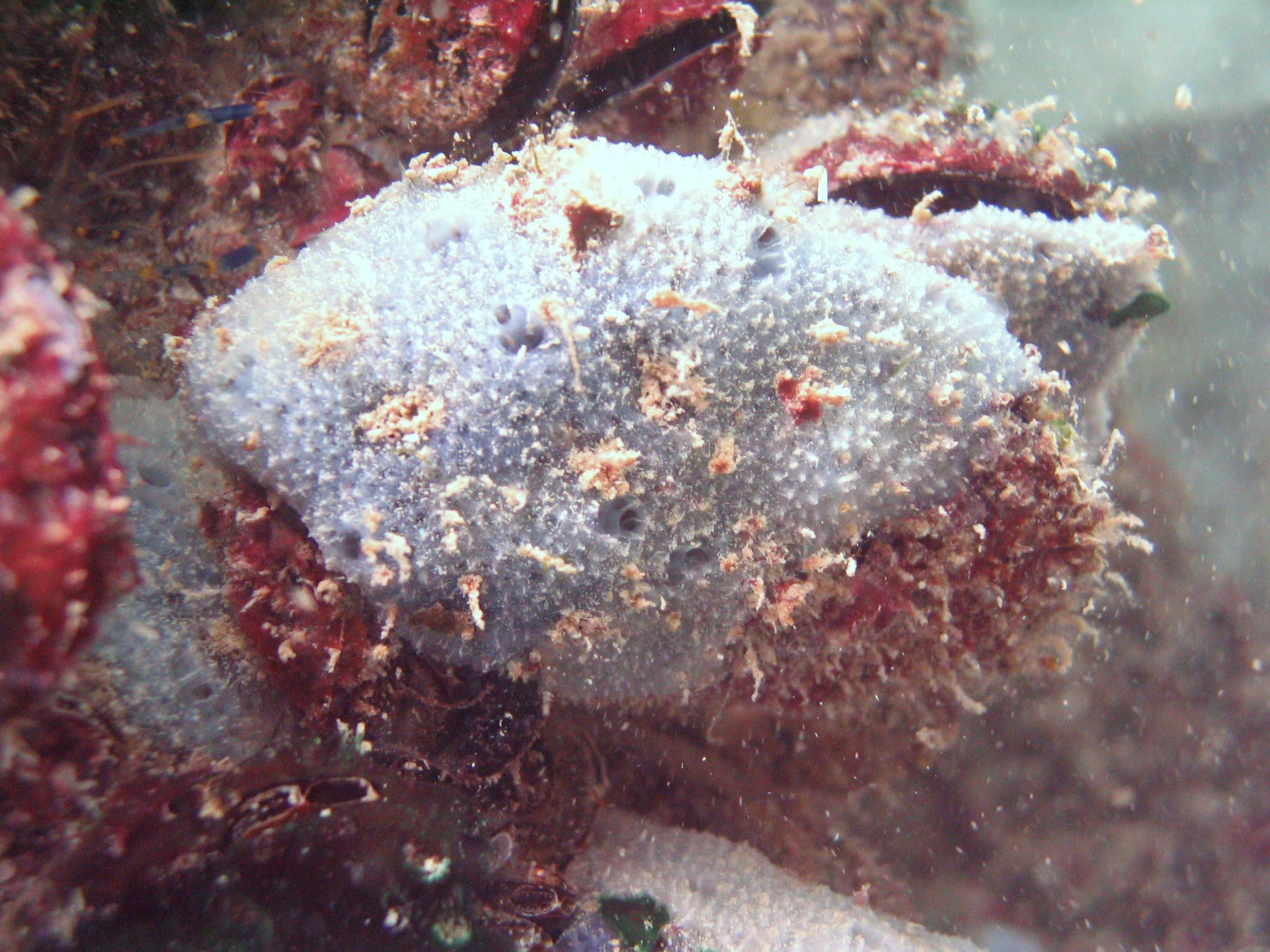
Blue sponge

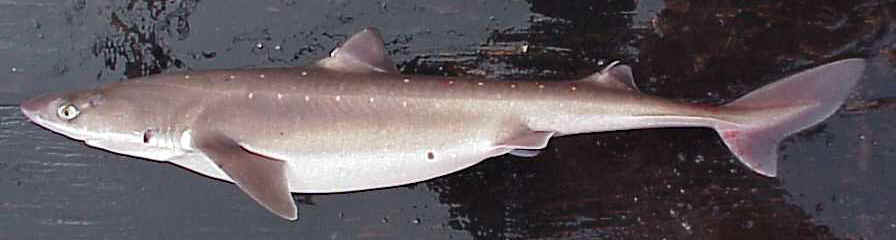
Spiny dogfish

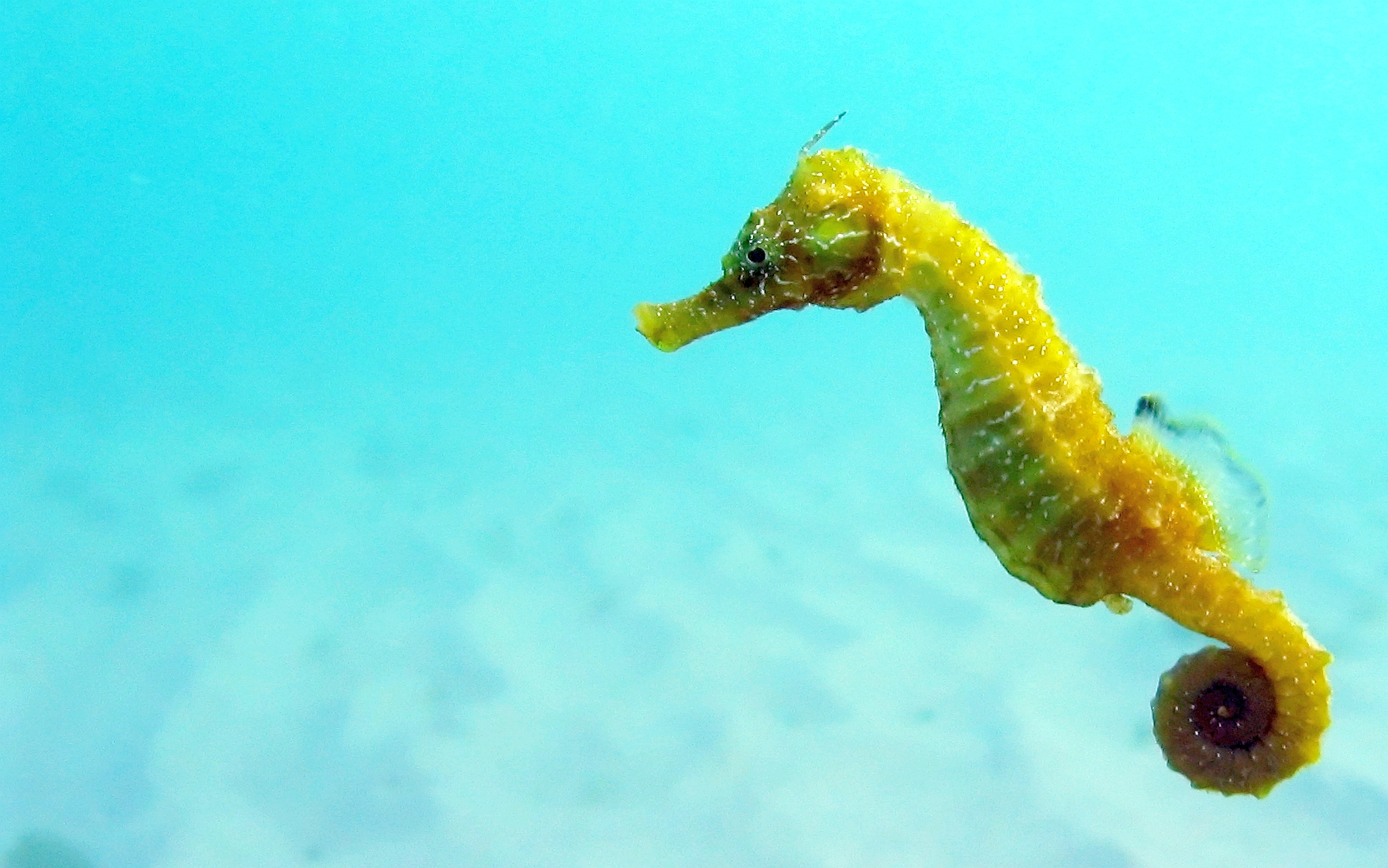
Seahorse

Black Sea common dolphin

== History ==
=== Mediterranean connection during the Holocene ===
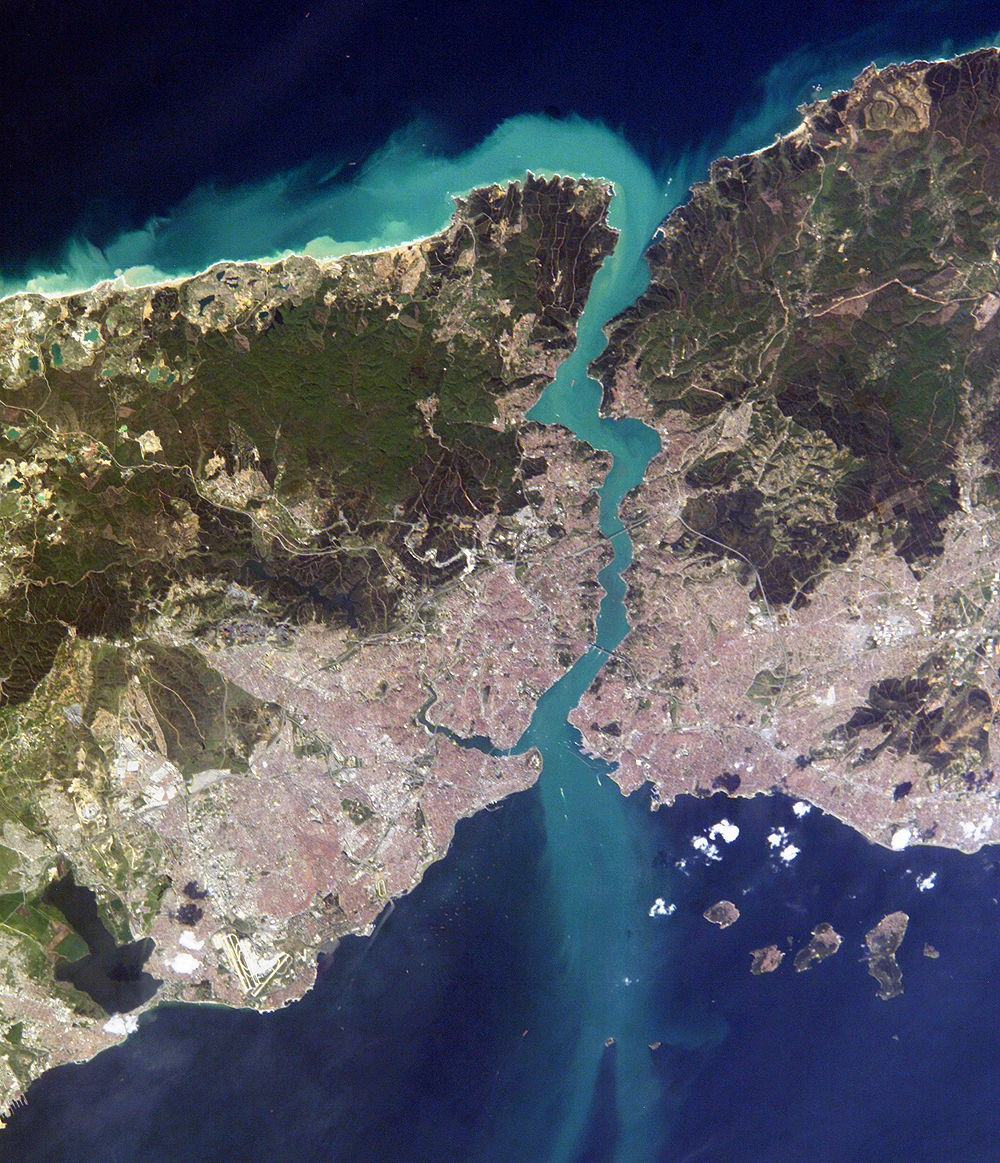
The Bosporus, taken from the International Space Station

The Black Sea is connected to the World Ocean by a chain of two shallow straits, the Dardanelles and the Bosporus. The Dardanelles is 55 m (180 ft) deep, and the Bosporus is as shallow as 36 m (118 ft). By comparison, at the height of the last ice age, sea levels were lower by more than 100 m (330 ft) than they are now.

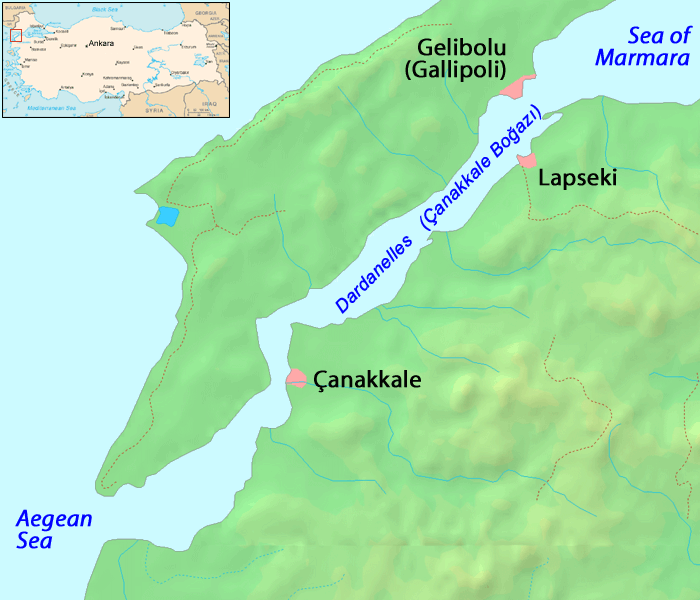
Map of the Dardanelles

There is evidence that water levels in the Black Sea were considerably lower at some point during the post-glacial period. Some researchers theorize that the Black Sea had been a landlocked freshwater lake (at least in upper layers) during the last glaciation and for some time after.

In the aftermath of the last glacial period, water levels in the Black Sea and the Aegean Sea rose independently until they were high enough to exchange water. The exact timeline of this development is still subject to debate. One possibility is that the Black Sea filled first, with excess freshwater flowing over the Bosporus sill and eventually into the Mediterranean Sea. There are also catastrophic scenarios, such as the "Black Sea deluge hypothesis" put forward by William Ryan, Walter Pitman and Petko Dimitrov.

==== Deluge hypothesis ====
The Black Sea deluge is a hypothesized catastrophic rise in the level of the Black Sea c. 5600 BC due to waters from the Mediterranean Sea breaching a sill in the Bosporus Strait. The hypothesis was headlined when The New York Times published it in December 1996, shortly before it was published in an academic journal. While it is agreed that the sequence of events described did occur, there is debate over the suddenness, dating, and magnitude of the events. Relevant to the hypothesis is that its description has led some to connect this catastrophe with prehistoric flood myths.

=== Archaeology ===
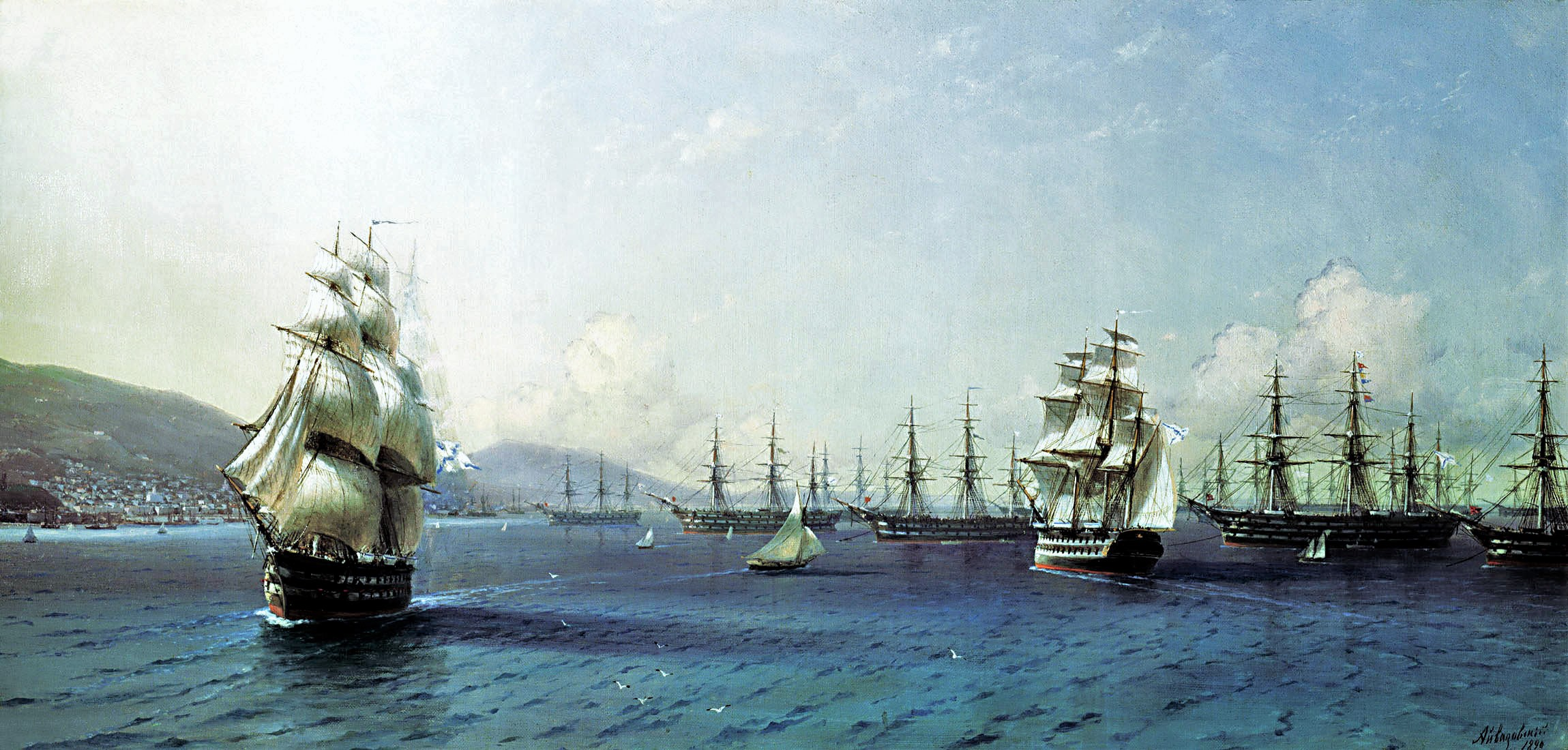
Ivan Aivazovsky. Black Sea Fleet in the Bay of Theodosia, just before the Crimean War

The Black Sea was sailed by Hittites, Carians, Colchians, Armenians, Thracians, Greeks, Persians, Cimmerians, Scythians, Romans, Byzantines, Goths, Huns, Avars, Slavs, Varangians, Crusaders, Venetians, Genoese, Georgians, Bulgarians, Tatars and Ottomans.

The concentration of historical powers, combined with the preservative qualities of the deep anoxic waters of the Black Sea, has attracted increased interest from marine archaeologists who have begun to discover a large number of ancient ships and organic remains in a high state of preservation.

=== Recorded history ===
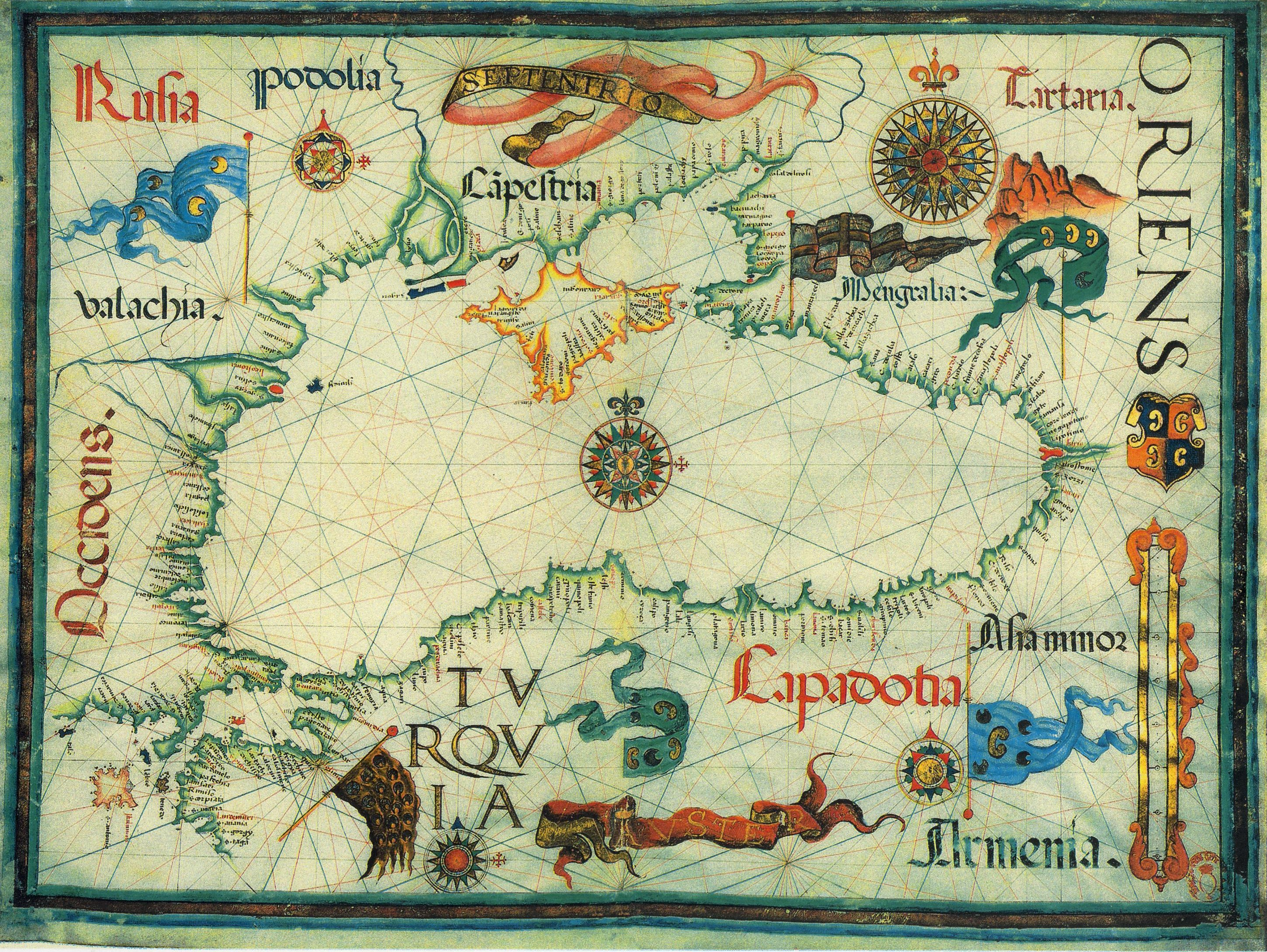
A 16th-century map of the Black Sea by Diogo Homem

The Black Sea was a busy waterway on the crossroads of the ancient world: the Balkans to the west, the Eurasian steppes to the north, the Caucasus and Central Asia to the east, Asia Minor and Mesopotamia to the south, and Greece to the southwest. The land at the eastern end of the Black Sea, Colchis (in present-day Georgia), marked for the ancient Greeks the edge of the known world.

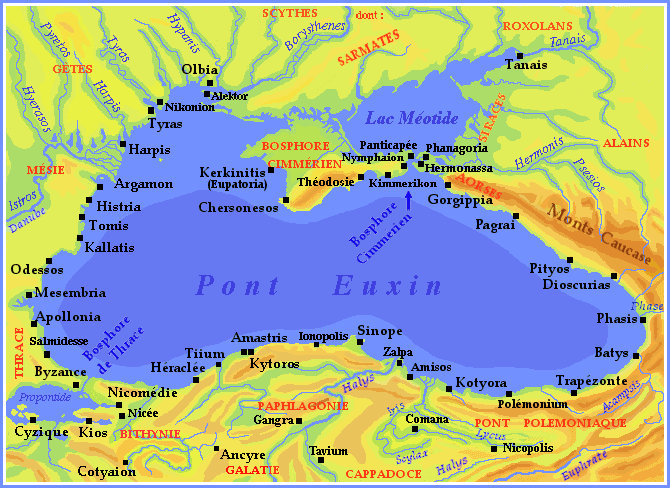
Greek colonies (8th–3rd century BC) of the Black Sea (Euxine, or "hospitable" sea)

The Pontic–Caspian steppe to the north of the Black Sea is seen by several researchers as the pre-historic original homeland (Urheimat) of the speakers of the Proto-Indo-European language (PIE).

Greek presence in the Black Sea began at least as early as the 9th century BC with colonies scattered along the Black Sea's southern coast, attracting traders and colonists due to the grain grown in the Black Sea hinterland. By 500 BC, permanent Greek communities existed all around the Black Sea, and a lucrative trade network connected the entirety of the Black Sea to the wider Mediterranean. While Greek colonies generally maintained very close cultural ties to their founding polis, Greek colonies in the Black Sea began to develop their own Black Sea Greek culture, known today as Pontic. The coastal communities of Black Sea Greeks remained a prominent part of the Greek world for centuries, and the realms of Mithridates of Pontus, Rome and Constantinople spanned the Black Sea to include Crimean territories.

The Black Sea became a virtual Ottoman Navy lake within five years of the Republic of Genoa losing control of the Crimean Peninsula in 1479, after which the only Western merchant vessels to sail its waters were those of Venice's old rival Ragusa. The Black Sea became a trade route of slaves between Crimea and Ottoman Anatolia via the Crimean–Nogai slave raids in Eastern Europe.

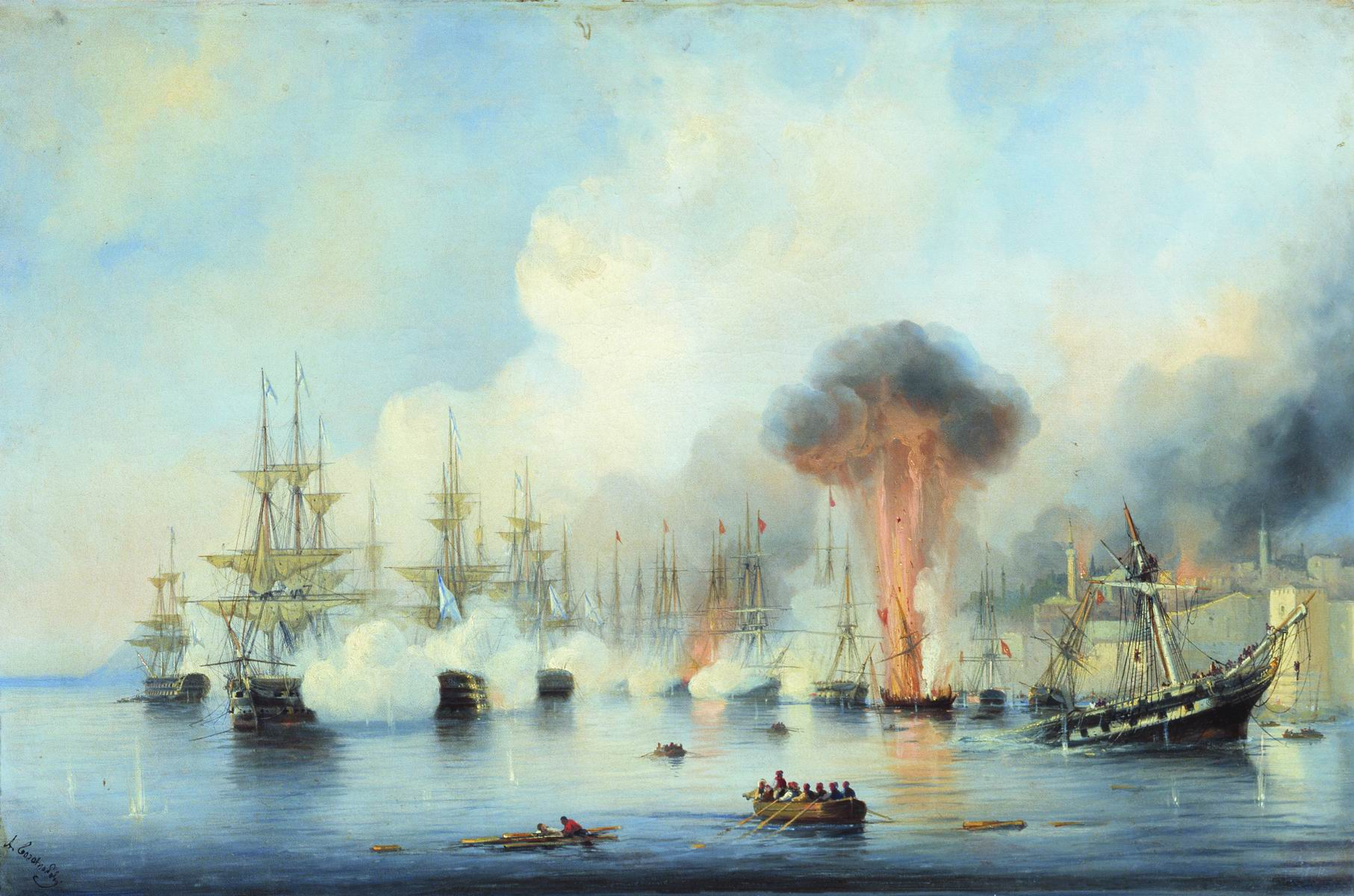
The destruction of the Ottoman fleet in Battle of Sinop

Imperial Russia became a significant Black Sea power in the late-18th century, occupying the littoral of Novorossiya in 1764 and of Crimea in 1783. Ottoman restrictions on Black Sea navigation were challenged by the Black Sea Fleet (founded in 1783) of the Imperial Russian Navy, and the Ottomans relaxed export controls after the outbreak in 1789 of the French Revolution.

=== Modern history ===
The Crimean War, fought between 1853 and 1856, saw naval engagements between the French and British allies and the forces of Nicholas I of Russia. On 2 March 1855, after the death of Nicholas I, Alexander II became Tsar. On 15 January 1856, the new tsar took Russia out of the war on the very unfavorable terms of the Treaty of Paris (1856), which included the loss of a naval fleet on the Black Sea, and the provision that the Black Sea was to be a demilitarized zone similar to a contemporaneous region of the Baltic Sea.

==== World Wars ====
The Black Sea was a significant naval theatre of World War I (1914–1918) and saw both naval and land battles between 1941 and 1945 during World War II. For example, Sevastopol was obliterated by the German Wehrmacht, successfully assisted by Schwerer Gustav in the Siege of Sevastopol (1941–1942). The Soviet naval base was one of the strongest fortifications in the world. Its site, on a deeply eroded, bare limestone promontory at the southwestern tip of the Crimea, made an approach by land forces exceedingly difficult. The high-level cliffs overlooking Severnaya Bay protected the anchorage, making an amphibious landing just as dangerous. The Soviet Navy had built upon these natural defenses by modernizing the port and installing heavy coastal batteries consisting of 180mm and 305mm re-purposed battleship guns which were capable of firing inland as well as out to sea. The artillery emplacements were protected by reinforced concrete fortifications and 9.8-inch thick armored turrets.

==== 21st century ====
In the 2022 Snake Island campaign, following the 2022 Russian invasion of Ukraine, Snake Island was a source of contention. On 24 February 2022, two Russian navy warships attacked and captured Snake Island. It was subsequently bombarded heavily by Ukraine. On 30 June 2022, Ukraine announced that it had driven Russian forces off the island.

On 14 April 2022, the flagship of the Black Sea Fleet, Russian cruiser Moskva was sunk by Ukrainian missiles.

As early as 29 April 2022 submarines of the Black Sea Fleet were used by Russia to bombard Ukrainian cities with Kalibr SLCMs. The Kalibr missile was so successful that on 10 March 2023 Defense Minister Sergey Shoigu announced plans to broaden the type of ship which carried it, to include the corvette Steregushchiy and the nuclear-powered cruiser Admiral Nakhimov.

On the morning of 14 March 2023, a Russian Su-27 fighter jet intercepted and damaged an American MQ-9 Reaper drone, causing the latter to crash into the Black Sea. At 13:20 on 5 May 2023 a Russian Su-35 fighter jet intercepted and threatened the safety of a Polish L-140 Turbolet on a "routine Frontex patrol mission.. and performed 'aggressive and dangerous' manoeuvres". The incident, which occurred "in international airspace over the Black Sea about 60km" east of Romanian airspace, "caused the crew of five Polish border guards to lose control of the plane and lose altitude."

Ship sinking near Romania's territorial waters after getting hit by a Russian drone, October 2026

The Black Sea remained a zone of conflict. As of January 2025, neither Ukraine nor Russia control the Black Sea, making it contested, claimed Estonian Navy Commander Ivo Värk. "The entire Black Sea can currently be seen as a contested maritime area where both sides have some room for action,". This room is greater near the coasts, where both sides benefit from air defense systems, sea mines, and various land-based weaponry. Warships only move out for specific operations to prevent excessive risks. He also noted that both parties operate gas drilling platforms equipped with surveillance devices to monitor the situation, but that those platforms often change hands.

In July 2026, Ukraine and Russia started attacking each other's ports and shipping using those ports in the Sea of Azov and Black Sea, leading to the closure of the Ukrainian deep-water ports in the Odesa area (Port of Chornomorsk, Port of Odesa, Pivdennyi Port) on 23 July. Due to the increasing number of attacks on commercial ships in 2026 and the high number of sailors killed or missing, the Financial Times referred to the Black Sea as "the world's deadliest shipping route".

== Economy and politics ==
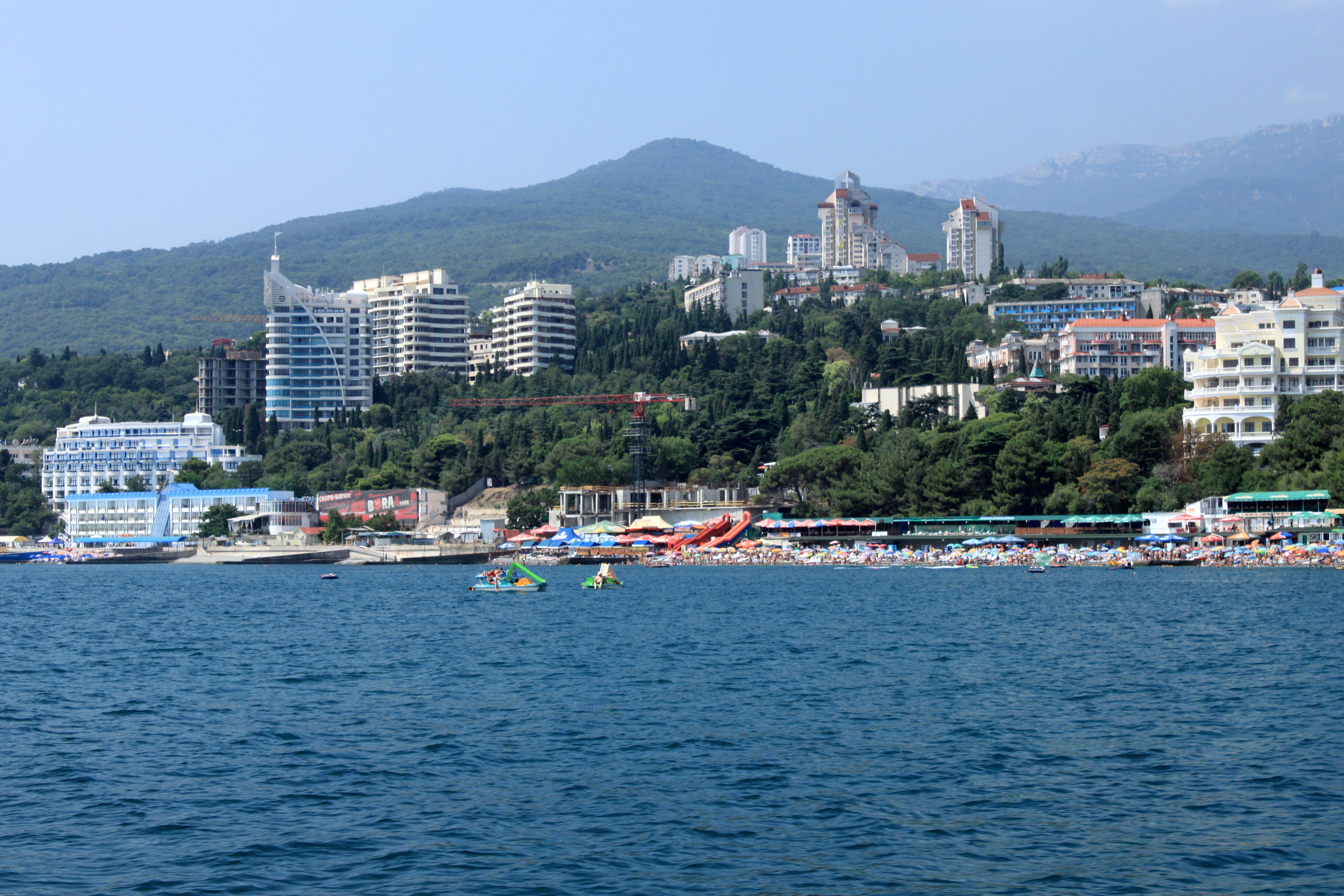
Yalta, Crimea

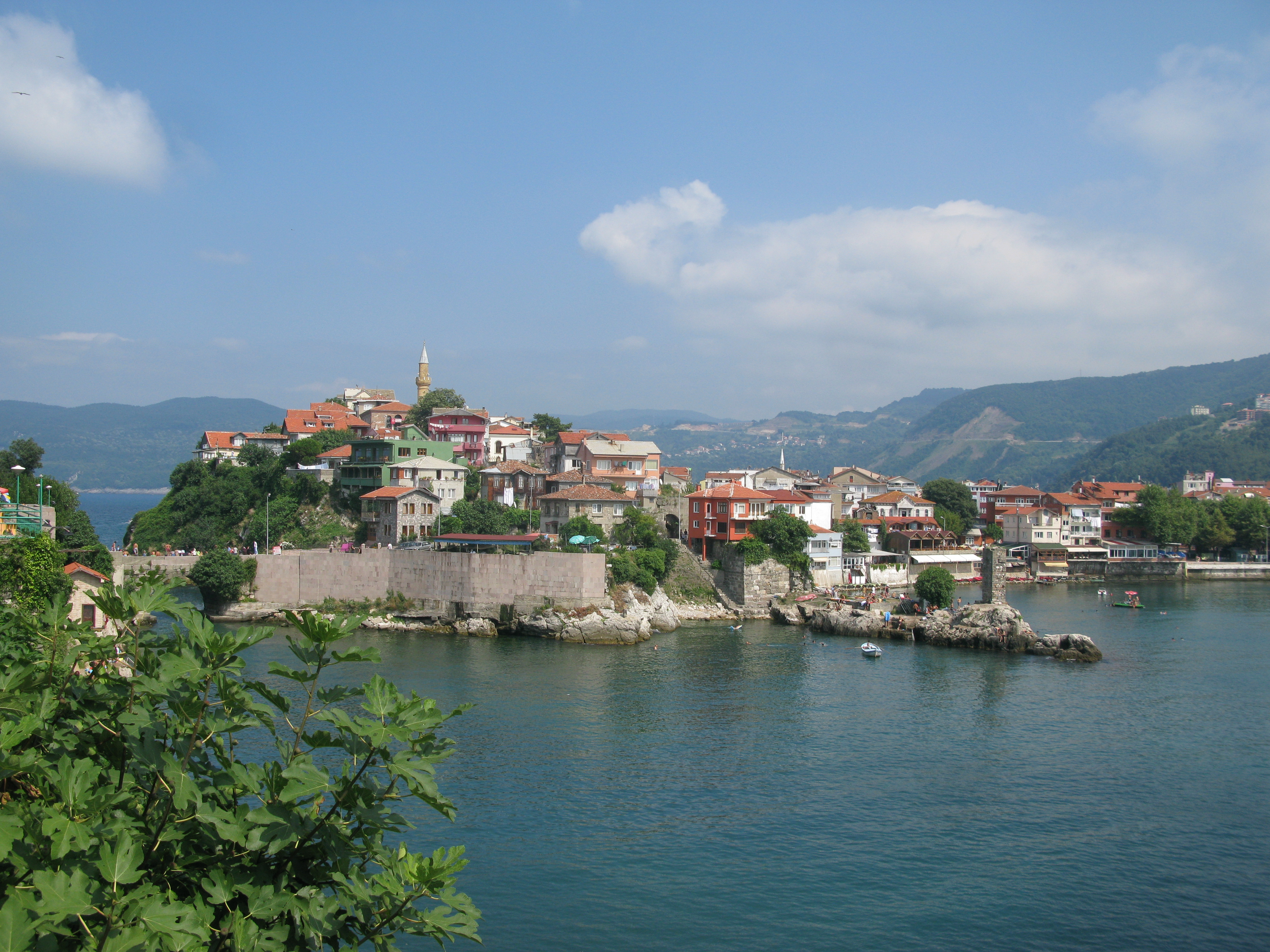
Amasra, Turkey, is located on a small island in the Black Sea.

The Black Sea plays an integral part in the connection between Asia and Europe. In addition to sea ports and fishing, key activities include hydrocarbons exploration for oil and natural gas, and tourism. According to NATO, the Black Sea is a strategic corridor that provides smuggling channels for moving legal and illegal goods including drugs, radioactive materials, and counterfeit goods that can be used to finance terrorism.

=== Navigation ===
According to an International Transport Workers' Federation 2013 study, there were at least 30 operating merchant seaports in the Black Sea (including at least 12 in Ukraine). There were also around 2,400 commercial vessels operating in the Black Sea.

=== Fishing ===
The Turkish commercial fishing fleet catches around 300,000 tons of anchovies per year. The fishery is carried out mainly in winter, and the highest portion of the stock is caught in November and December.

=== Hydrocarbon exploration ===
The Black Sea contains oil and natural gas resources but exploration in the sea is incomplete. As of 2017, 20 wells are in place. Throughout much of its existence, the Black Sea has had significant oil and gas-forming potential because of significant inflows of sediment and nutrient-rich waters. However, this varies geographically. For example, prospects are poorer off the coast of Bulgaria because of the large influx of sediment from the Danube which obscured sunlight and diluted organic-rich sediments. Many of the discoveries to date have taken place offshore of Romania in the Western Black Sea and only a few discoveries have been made in the Eastern Black Sea.

During the Eocene, the Paratethys Sea was partially isolated and sea levels fell. During this time sand shed off the rising Balkanide, Pontide and Caucasus mountains trapped organic material in the Maykop Suite of rocks through the Oligocene and early Miocene. Natural gas appears in rocks deposited in the Miocene and Pliocene by the paleo-Dnieper and paleo-Dniester rivers, or in deep-water Oligocene-age rocks. Serious exploration began in 1999 with two deep-water wells, Limanköy-1 and Limanköy-2, drilled in Turkish waters. Next, the HPX (Hopa)-1 deepwater well targeted late Miocene sandstone units in Achara-Trialeti fold belt (also known as the Gurian fold belt) along the Georgia-Turkey maritime border. Although geologists inferred that these rocks might have hydrocarbons that migrated from the Maykop Suite, the well was unsuccessful. No more drilling happened for five years after the HPX-1 well. In 2010, Sinop-1 targeted carbonate reservoirs potentially charged from the nearby Maykop Suite on the Andrusov Ridge, but the well-struck only Cretaceous volcanic rocks. Yassihöyük-1 encountered similar problems.

Other Turkish wells, Sürmene-1 and Sile-1 drilled in the Eastern Black Sea in 2011 and 2015 respectively tested four-way closures above Cretaceous volcanoes, with no results in either case. A different Turkish well, Kastamonu-1 drilled in 2011 did successfully find thermogenic gas in Pliocene and Miocene shale-cored anticlines in the Western Black Sea. A year later in 2012, Romania drilled Domino-1 which struck gas prompting the drilling of other wells in the Neptun Deep. In 2016, the Bulgarian well Polshkov-1 targeted Maykop Suite sandstones in the Polshkov High and Russia is in the process of drilling Jurassic carbonates on the Shatsky Ridge as of 2018.

In August 2020, Turkey found 320 billion cubic metres (11 trillion cubic feet) of natural gas in the biggest ever discovery in the Black Sea, and hoped to begin production in the Sakarya Gas Field by 2023. The sector is near where Romania has also found gas reserves.

=== Urban areas ===
Most populous urban areas along the Black Sea
City	Image	Country	Region/county	Population (urban)
Istanbul		Turkey	Istanbul	15,340,111
Odesa		Ukraine	Odesa	1,003,705
Samsun		Turkey	Samsun	639,930
Varna		Bulgaria	Varna	500,076
Constanța		Romania	Constanța	491,498
Sevastopol		disputed: Ukraine (de jure); Russia (de facto)	City with special status / Federal city	379,200
Sochi		Russia	Krasnodar Krai	343,334
Trabzon		Turkey	Trabzon	293,661
Novorossiysk		Russia	Krasnodar Krai	241,952
Burgas		Bulgaria	Burgas	223,902
Batumi		Georgia	Adjara	204,156
Ordu		Turkey	Ordu	190,425
Kerch		disputed: Ukraine (de jure); Russia (de facto)	Autonomous Republic of Crimea / Republic of Crimea	149,566

=== Tourism ===
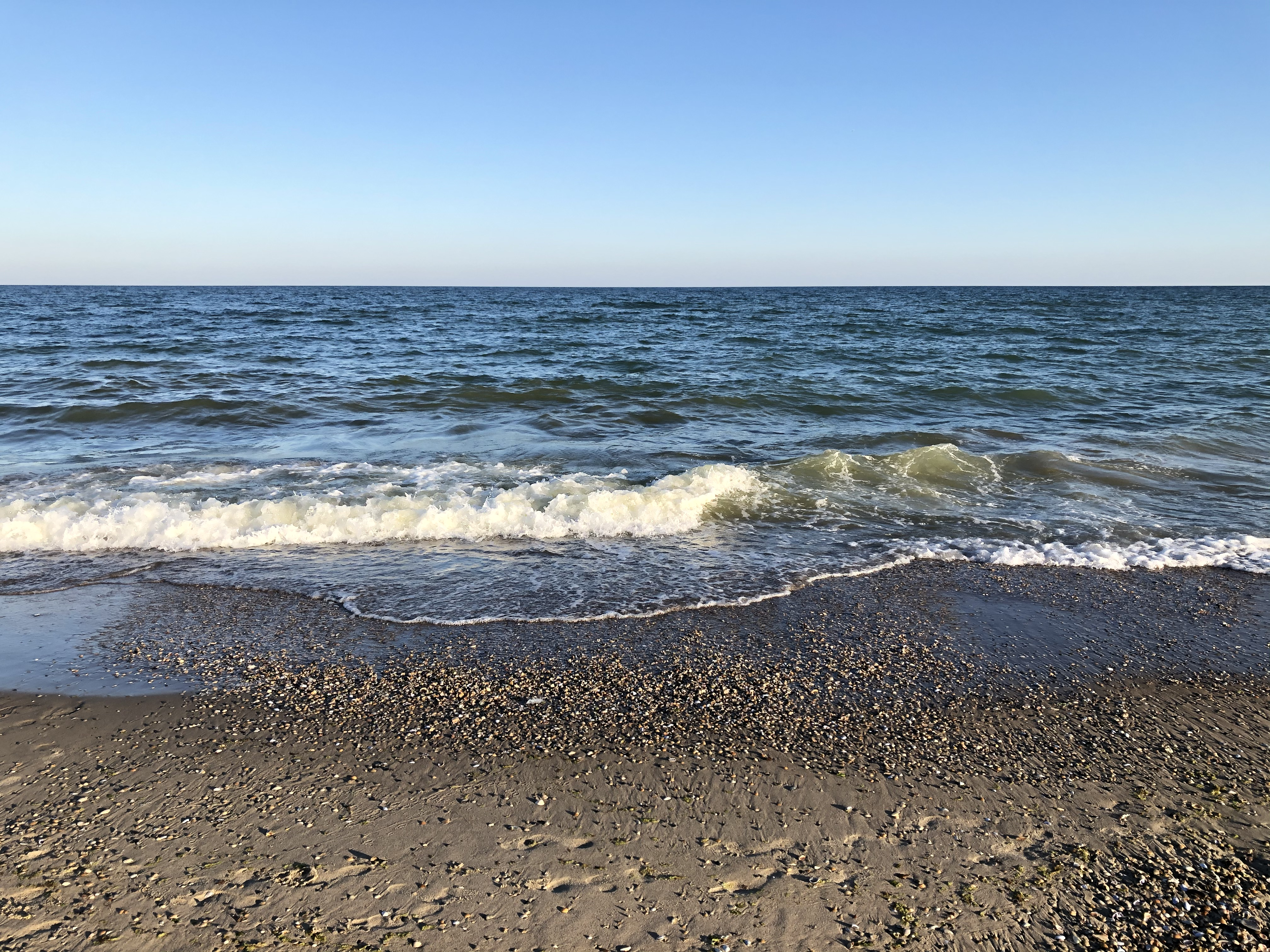
Black Sea beach in Zatoka, Ukraine

In the years following the end of the Cold War, the popularity of the Black Sea as a tourist destination steadily increased. Tourism at Black Sea resorts became one of the region's growth industries.

The following is a list of notable Black Sea resort towns:

- 2 Mai (Romania)
- Agigea (Romania)
- Ahtopol (Bulgaria)
- Amasra (Turkey)
- Anaklia (Georgia)
- Anapa (Russia)
- Albena (Bulgaria)
- Alupka (Crimea, Ukraine/Russia (disputed))
- Alushta (Crimea, Ukraine/Russia (disputed))
- Balchik (Bulgaria)
- Batumi (Georgia)
- Burgas (Bulgaria)
- Byala (Bulgaria)
- Cap Aurora (Romania)
- Chakvi (Georgia)
- Constanța (Romania)
- Constantine and Helena (Bulgaria)
- Corbu (Romania)
- Costinești (Romania)
- Eforie (Romania)
- Emona (Bulgaria)
- Feodosia (Crimea, Ukraine/Russia (disputed))
- Foros (Crimea, Ukraine/Russia (disputed))
- Gagra (Abkhazia/Georgia)
- Gelendzhik (Russia)
- Giresun (Turkey)
- Golden Sands (Bulgaria)
- Gonio (Georgia)
- Gudauta and subsequently the Gudauta Bay (Abkhazia/Georgia)
- Gurzuf (Crimea, Ukraine/Russia (disputed))
- Hopa (Artvin, Turkey)
- Jupiter (Romania)
- Kamchia (Bulgaria)
- Kavarna (Bulgaria)
- Kiten (Bulgaria)
- Kobuleti (Georgia)
- Koktebel (Crimea, Ukraine/Russia (disputed))
- Lozenetz (Bulgaria)
- Mamaia (Romania)
- Mangalia (Romania)
- Năvodari (Romania)
- Neptun (Romania)
- Nesebar (Bulgaria)
- Novorossiysk (Russia)
- Obzor (Bulgaria)
- Odesa (Ukraine)
- Olimp (Romania)
- Ordu (Turkey)
- Pitsunda/Bichvinta (Abkhazia/Georgia)
- Pomorie (Bulgaria)
- Primorsko (Bulgaria)
- Rize (Turkey)
- Rusalka (Bulgaria)
- Samsun (Turkey)
- Saturn (Romania)
- Şile (Turkey)
- Sinop (Turkey)
- Skadovsk (Ukraine)
- Sochi (Russia)
- Sozopol (Bulgaria)
- Sudak (Crimea, Ukraine/Russia (disputed))
- Sulina (Romania)
- Sunny Beach (Bulgaria)
- Sveti Vlas (Bulgaria)
- Trabzon (Turkey)
- Tsikhisdziri (Georgia)
- Tuapse (Russia)
- Ureki (Georgia)
- Vama Veche (Romania)
- Varna (Bulgaria)
- Venus (Romania)
- Yalta (Crimea, Ukraine/Russia (disputed))
- Yevpatoria (Crimea, Ukraine/Russia (disputed))
- Zonguldak (Turkey)

=== Modern military use ===
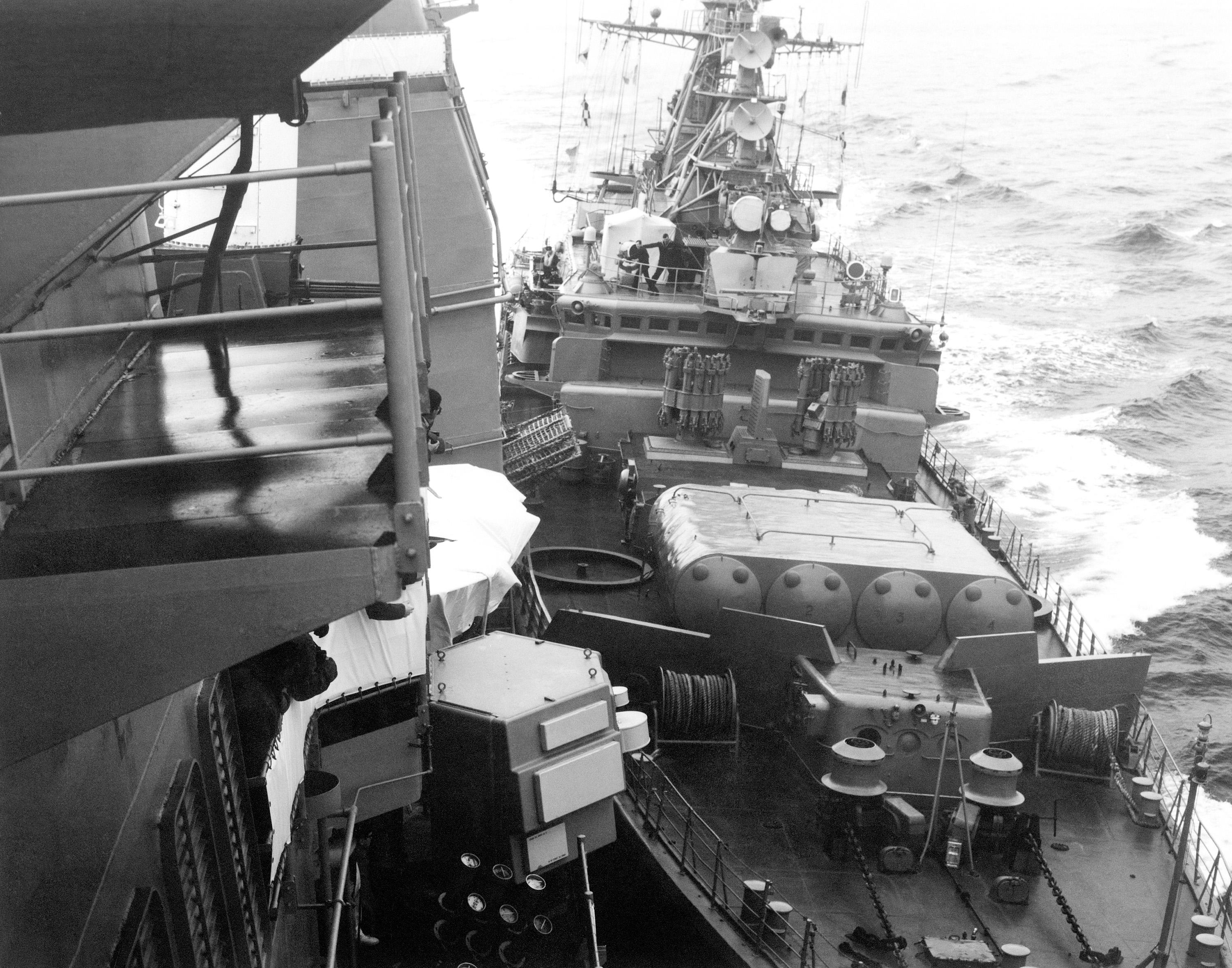
Soviet frigate Bezzavetny (right) bumping the USS Yorktown during the 1988 Black Sea bumping incident

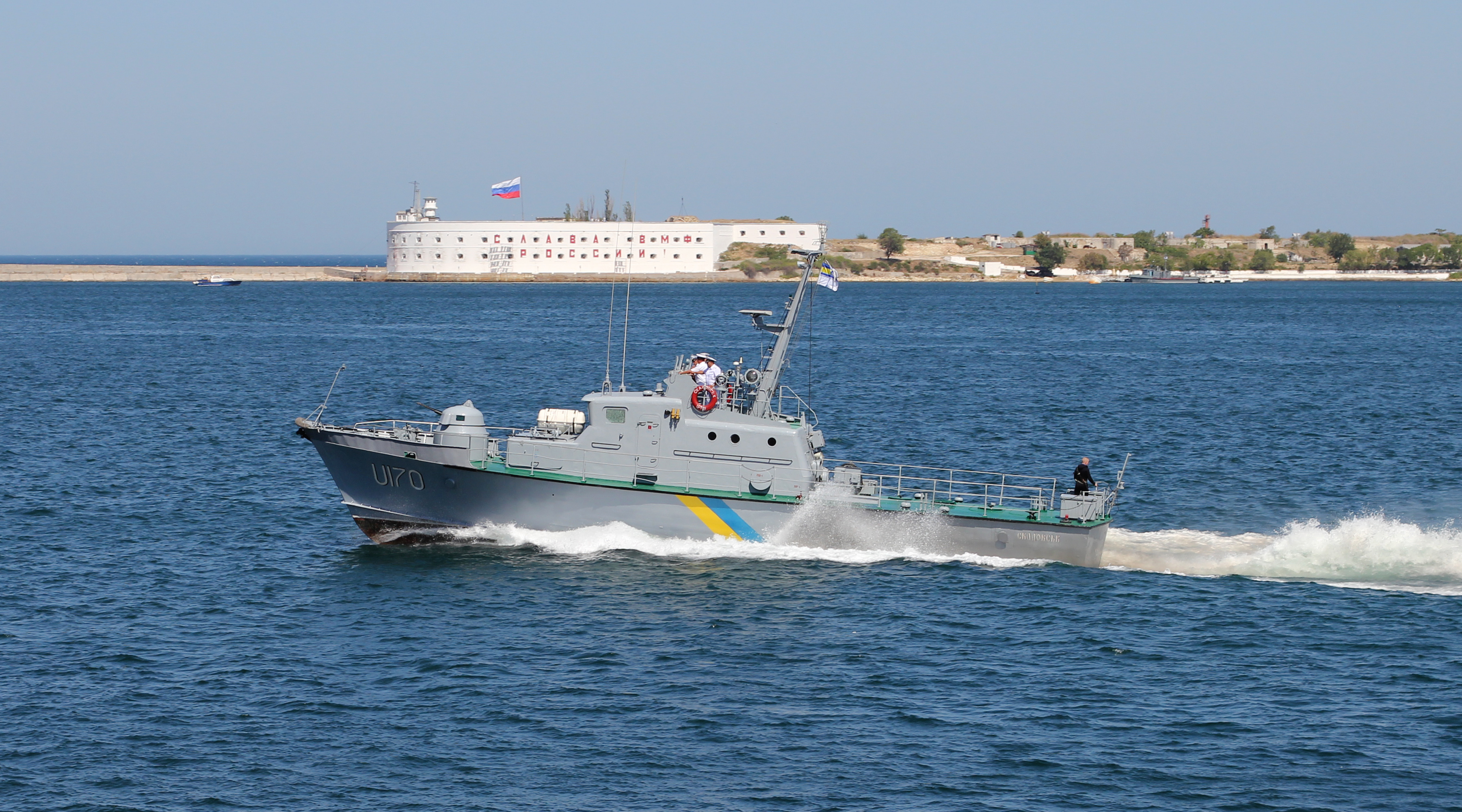
Ukrainian Navy artillery boat U170 in the Bay of Sevastopol

The 1936 Montreux Convention provides for free passage of civilian ships between the international waters of the Black and the Mediterranean seas. However, a single country (Turkey) has complete control over the straits connecting the two seas. Military ships are categorized separately from civilian vessels and can pass through the straits only if the ship belongs to a Black Sea country. Other military ships have the right to pass through the straits if they are not in a war against Turkey and if they stay in the Black Sea basin for a limited time. The 1982 amendments to the Montreux Convention allow Turkey to close the straits at its discretion in both war and peacetime.

The Montreux Convention governs the passage of vessels between the Black, Mediterranean, and Aegean seas and the presence of military vessels belonging to non-littoral states in the Black Sea waters.

The Russian Black Sea Fleet has its official primary headquarters and facilities in the city of Sevastopol (Sevastopol Naval Base).

The Soviet hospital ship Armenia was sunk on 7 November 1941 by German aircraft while evacuating civilians and wounded soldiers from Crimea. It has been estimated that approximately 5,000 to 7,000 people were killed during the sinking, making it one of the deadliest maritime disasters in history. There were only eight survivors.

In December 2018, the Kerch Strait incident occurred, in which the Russian navy and coast guard took control of three Ukrainian vessels as the ships were trying to transit from the Black Sea into the Sea of Azov.

In April 2022, following the 2022 Russian invasion of Ukraine, the Russian cruiser Moskva was sunk in the western Black Sea by sea-skimming R-360 Neptune missiles of the Armed Forces of Ukraine while the Russians claimed that an onboard fire had caused munitions to explode and damage the ship extensively. She was the largest ship to be lost in naval combat in Europe since World War II.

In late 2023, Russia announced plans to build a naval base on the Black Sea coast of Abkhazia.

== See also ==
- 1927 Crimean earthquakes
- Kerch Strait
- Regions of Europe
- Sea of Azov
- Laz people
- Lazistan Sanjak
- Lazistan

== Notes and references ==
=== General and cited references ===
- Ascherson, Neal (1996). Black Sea. Vintage. ISBN 0-09-959371-8.
- Dimitrov, Petko; Dimitrov, Dimitar (2004). The Black Sea, the Flood and the Ancient Myths. Varna. p. 91. ISBN 978-954-579-335-6.
- Dimitrov, Dimitar (August 2010). Geology and Non-traditional Resources of the Black Sea. LAP (Lambert Academic Publishing). doi:10.13140/RG.2.2.20631.88486. ISBN 978-3-8383-8639-3. Archived from the original on 9 February 2022.
- Ghervas, Stella (2008). "Odessa et les confins de l'Europe: un éclairage historique", in Stella Ghervas et François Rosset (ed.), Lieux d'Europe. Mythes et limites. Paris: Editions de la Maison des sciences de l'homme. pp. 107–124. ISBN 978-2-7351-1182-4.
- Ghervas, Stella (2017). "The Black Sea". In Armitage, D.; Bashford, S. (eds.). Oceanic Histories. Cambridge: Cambridge University Press. pp. 234–266. doi:10.1017/9781108399722.010. ISBN 978-1-1083-9972-2. Archived from the original on 5 February 2022.
- Grinevetsky, Sergei R.; Zonn, Igor S.; Zhiltsov, Sergei S.; Kosarev, Aleksey N.; Kostianoy, Andrey G., eds. (30 September 2014). The Black Sea Encyclopedia. Springer. ISBN 978-3-642-55227-4.
- King, Charles (2004). The Black Sea: A History. ISBN 0-19-924161-9.
- Ryan, William, and Walter Pitman (1999). Noah's Flood. ISBN 0-684-85920-3.
- Schmitt, Rüdiger (1989). "Black Sea". In Yarshater, Ehsan (ed.). Encyclopædia Iranica. Vol. IV/3: Bibliographies II–Bolbol I. London and New York: Routledge & Kegan Paul. pp. 310–313. ISBN 978-0-71009-126-0.
- Schmitt, Rüdiger (1996). "Considerations on the Name of the Black Sea", in: Hellas und der griechische Osten. Saarbrücken. pp. 219–224.
- West, Stephanie (October 2003). "'The Most Marvellous of All Seas': The Greek Encounter with the Euxine". Greece & Rome. 50 (2): 151–167. doi:10.1093/gr/50.2.151. JSTOR 3567890.
