= Klance =

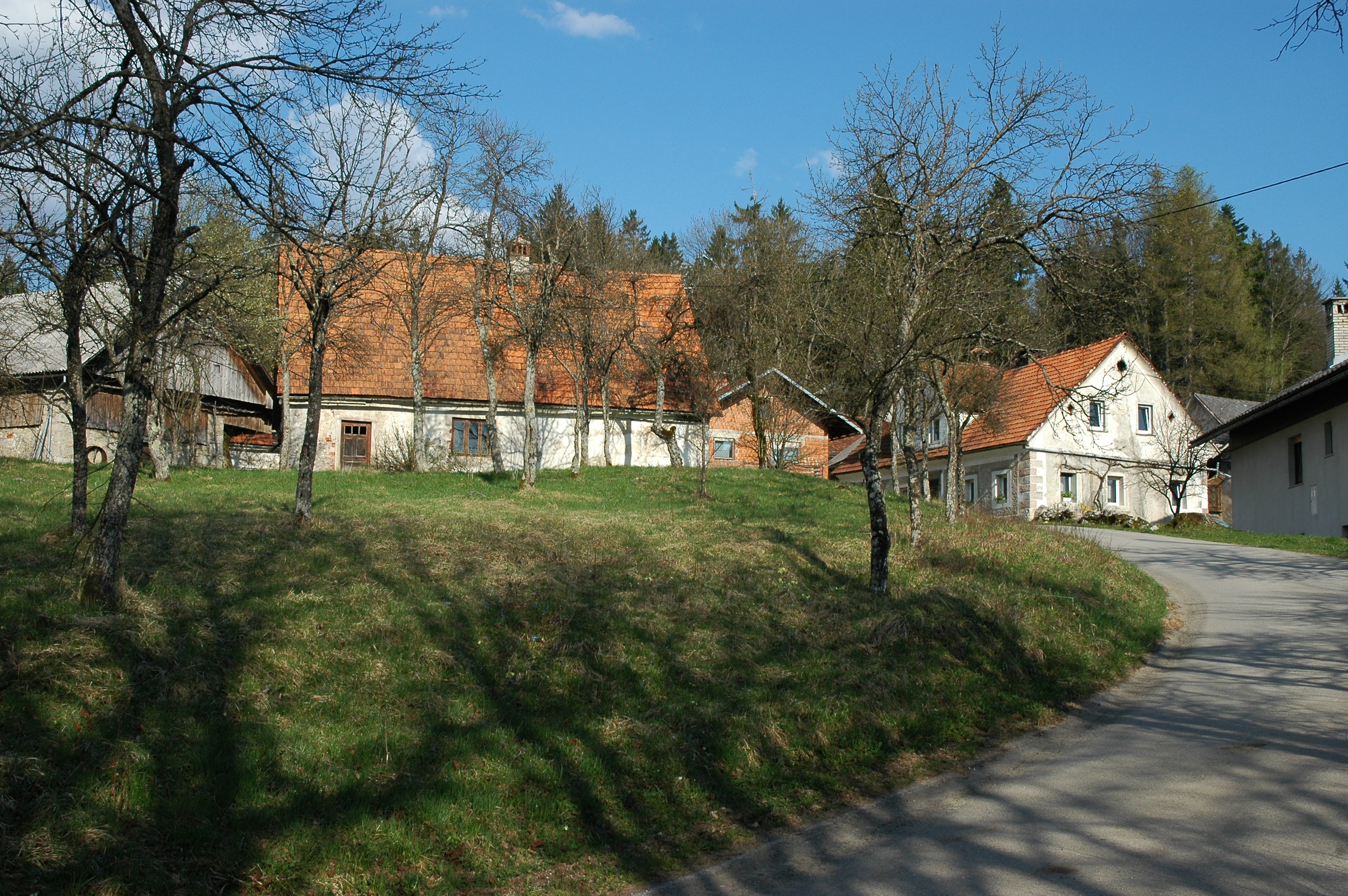

- Location in Slovenia
- Coordinates: 45°43′23.73″N 14°25′56.68″E
- Country: Slovenia
- Traditional region: Inner Carniola
- Statistical region: Littoral–Inner Carniola
- Municipality: Loška Dolina

Area
  - Total: 1.06 km^{2} (0.41 sq mi)
- Elevation: 693 m (2,274 ft)

Population (2002)
  - Total: 16

Klance (pronounced [ˈklaːntsɛ]) is a small village northwest of Dane in the Municipality of Loška Dolina in the Inner Carniola region of Slovenia.

== History ==
Klance was a hamlet of Dane until 1986, when it was separated and made a village in its own right.

== Church ==
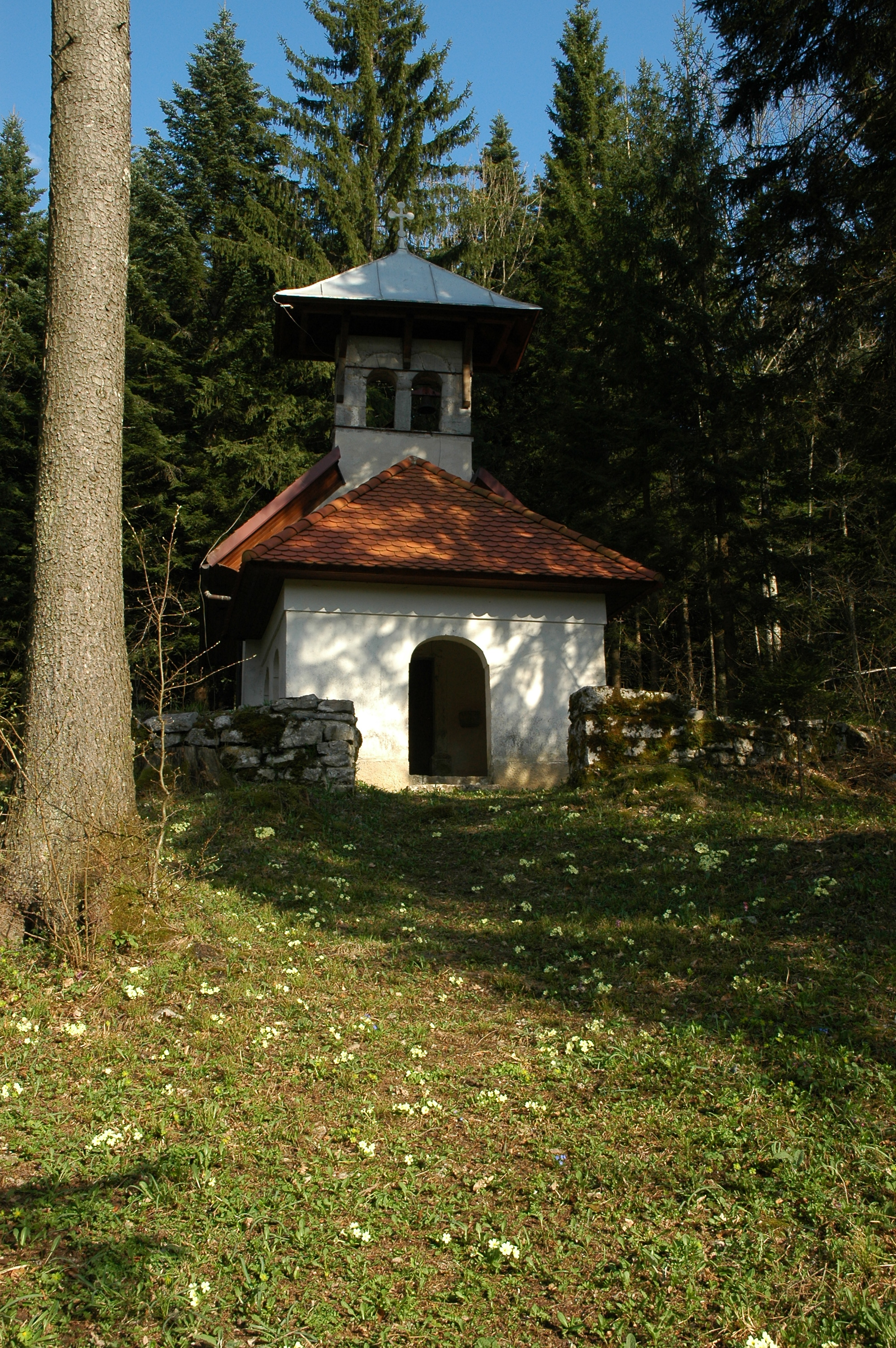
Church in Klance

The local church, built in a forest above the settlement, is dedicated to Saint Pancras and belong to the Parish of Stari Trg. It was first mentioned in written documents dating to 1526. The belfry was built in 1647.
