= Knežja Njiva =

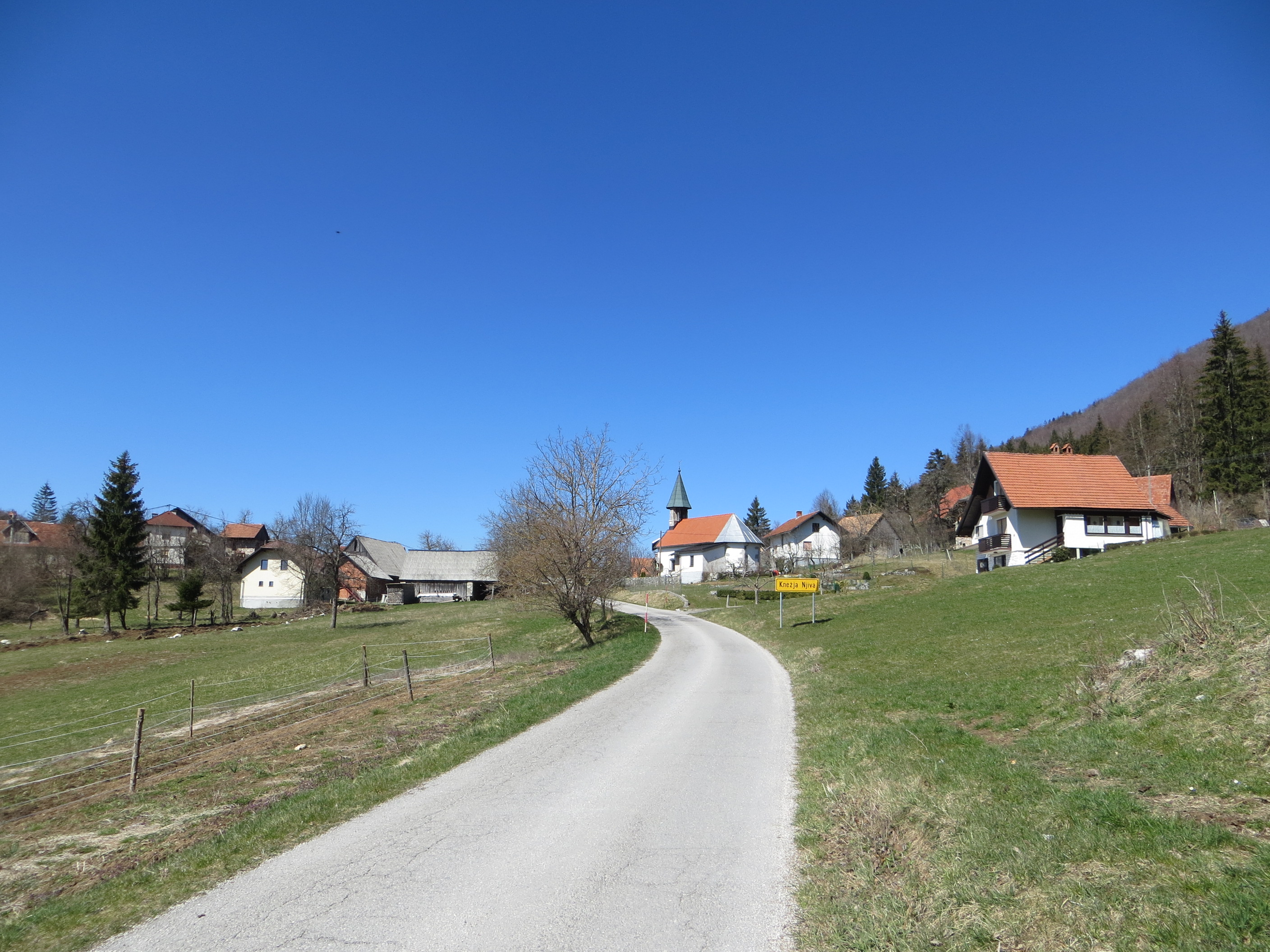

- Location in Slovenia
- Coordinates: 45°43′9.63″N 14°29′59.15″E
- Country: Slovenia
- Traditional region: Inner Carniola
- Statistical region: Littoral–Inner Carniola
- Municipality: Loška Dolina

Area
  - Total: 6.32 km^{2} (2.44 sq mi)
- Elevation: 701 m (2,300 ft)

Population (2002)
  - Total: 29

Knežja Njiva (pronounced [ˈkneːʒja ˈnjiːʋa], German: Grafenacker) is a small village to the northeast above Markovec in the Municipality of Loška Dolina in the Inner Carniola region of Slovenia. It is known locally as Gorenja.

== Church ==
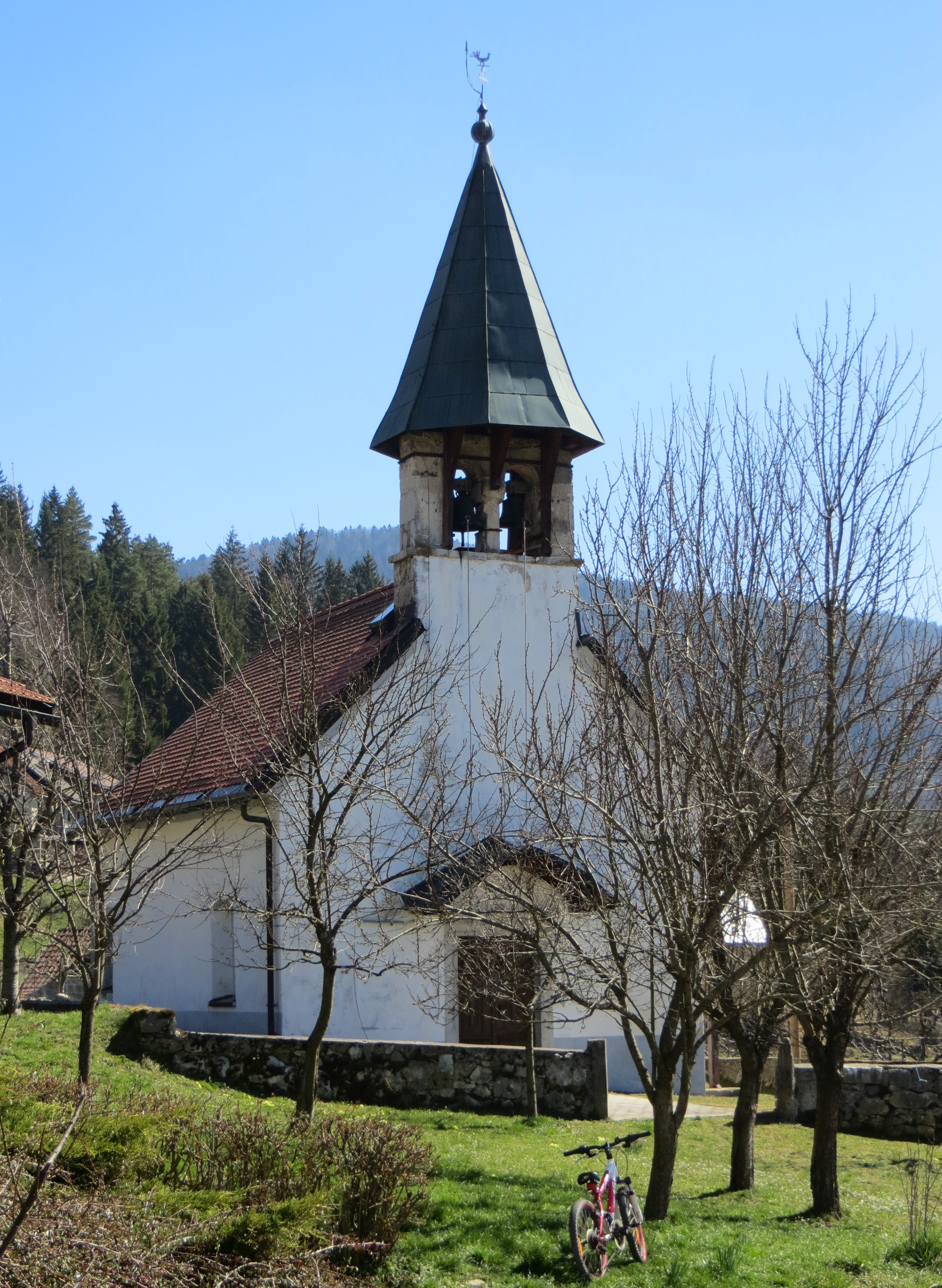
Holy Trinity Church

The local church in the settlement is dedicated to the Holy Trinity and belongs to the parish of Stari Trg.
