= Vrh, Loška Dolina =

Vrh
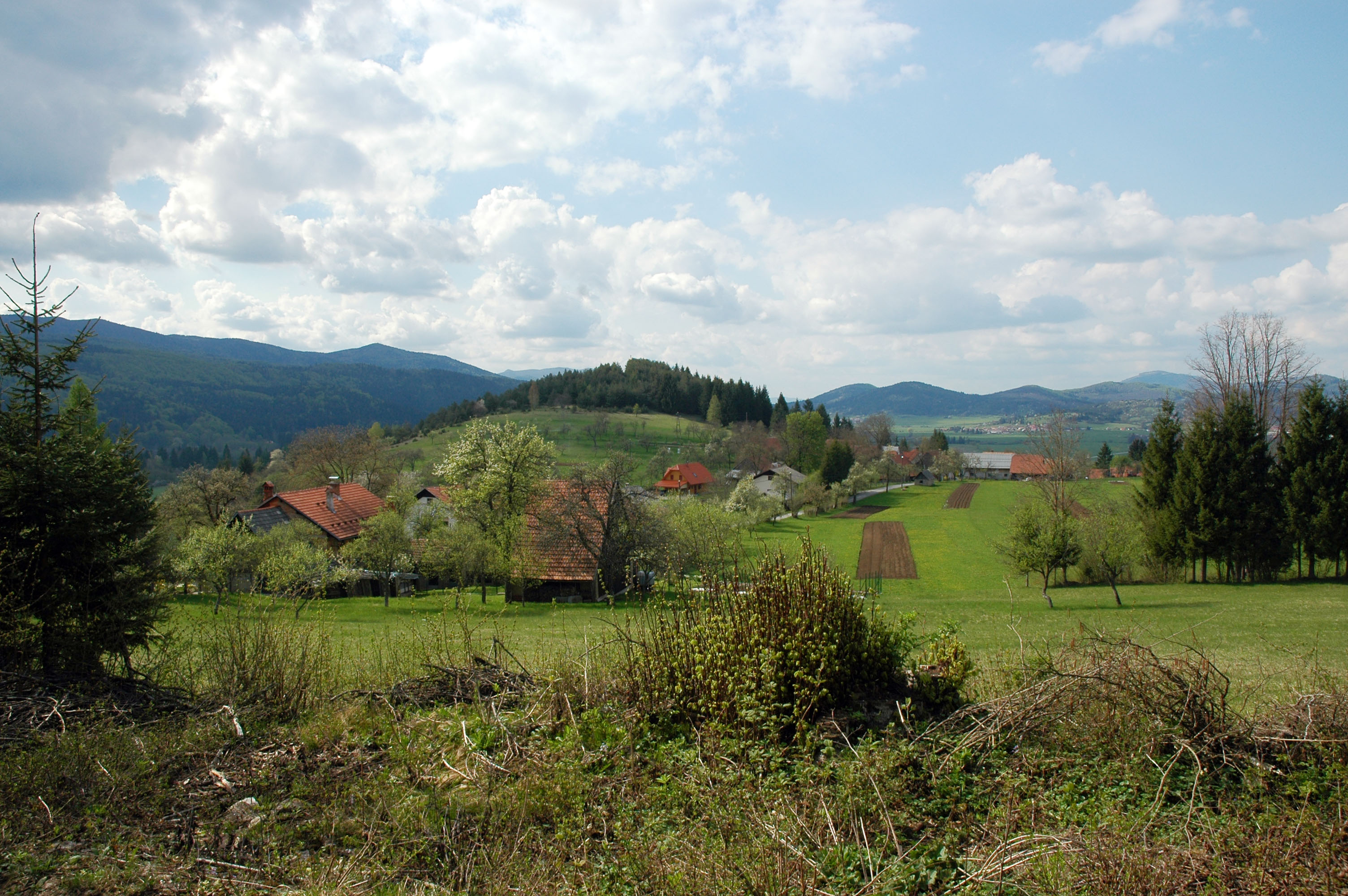

- Location in Slovenia
- Coordinates: 45°40′49.87″N 14°29′25.27″E
- Country: Slovenia
- Traditional region: Inner Carniola
- Statistical region: Littoral–Inner Carniola
- Municipality: Loška Dolina

Area
  - Total: 14.66 km^{2} (5.66 sq mi)
- Elevation: 644.8 m (2,115 ft)

Population (2002)
  - Total: 36

Vrh (pronounced [ˈʋəɾx], German: Werch) is a small village south of Podgora in the Municipality of Loška Dolina in the Inner Carniola region of Slovenia.

== Mass grave ==
Vrh is the site of a mass grave from the period immediately after the Second World War. The Nevinje Cave Mass Grave (Slovene: Grobišče Nevinje jama), also known as the Troha Woods Cave Mass Grave (Jama v Trohovem gozdu), lies in the northeast foothills of Mount Snežnik, 1 kilometer (0.62 mi) east of the Grajševka hunting lodge. It was used after the war to liquidate opponents of the communist movement.

== Church ==
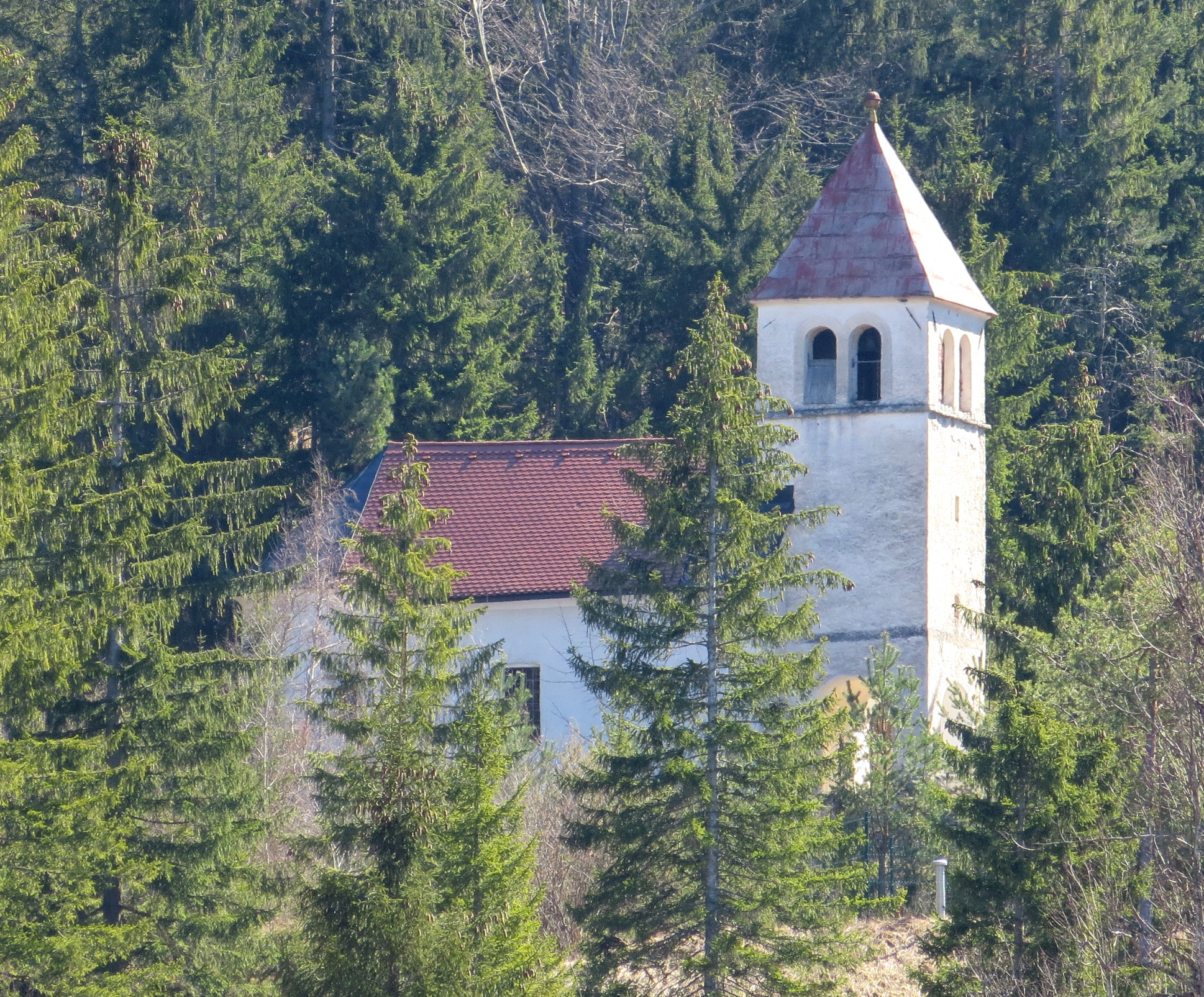
Saint Thomas's Church

The local church in the settlement is dedicated to Saint Thomas and belongs to the Parish of Stari Trg.
