= Iga Vas =

- Village
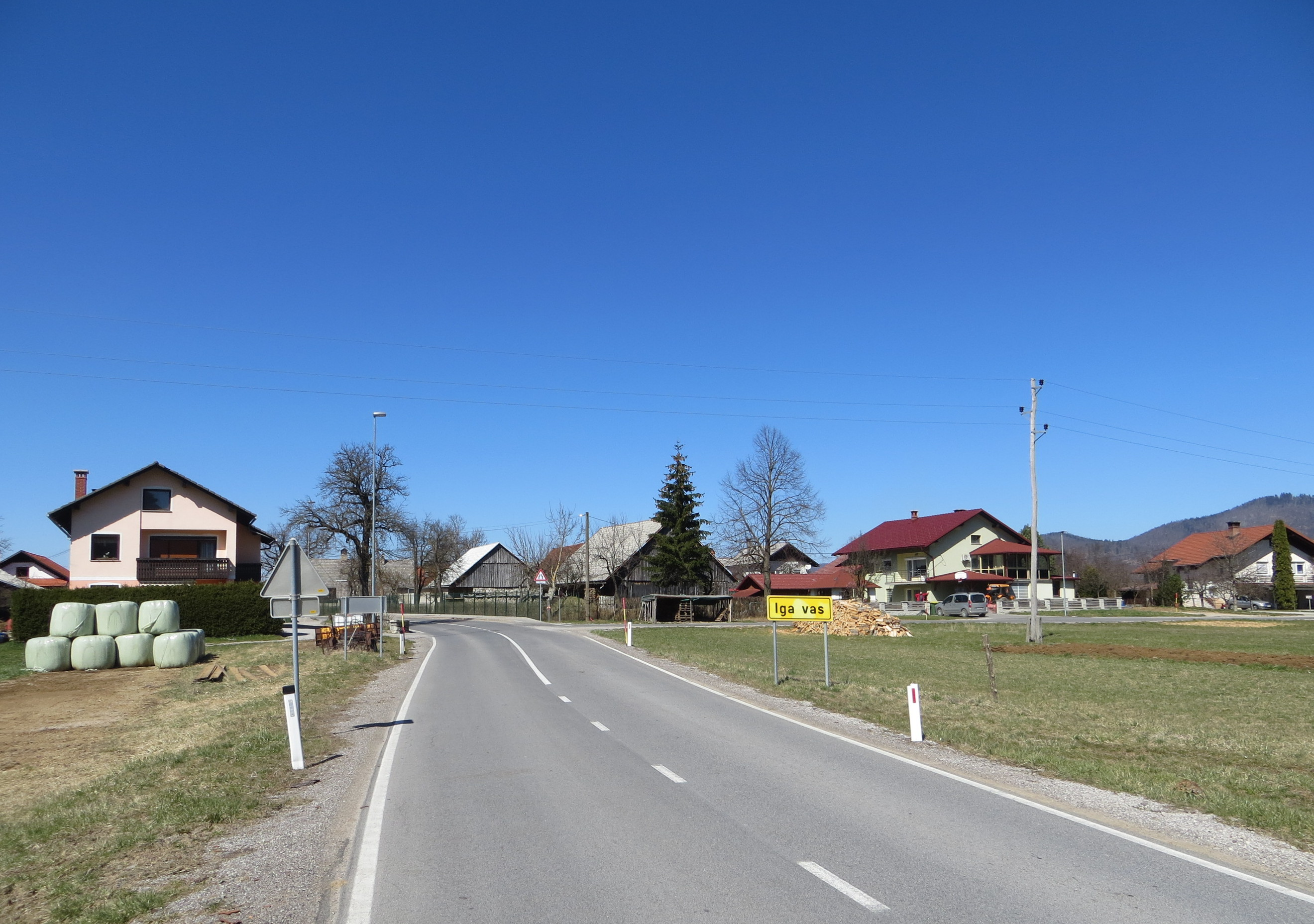

- Location in Slovenia
- Coordinates: 45°41′24.45″N 14°29′7.85″E
- Country: Slovenia
- Traditional region: Inner Carniola
- Statistical region: Littoral–Inner Carniola
- Municipality: Loška Dolina

Area
  - Total: 2.08 km^{2} (0.80 sq mi)
- Elevation: 585.1 m (1,920 ft)

Population (2002)
  - Total: 212

Iga Vas (pronounced [ˈiːɡa ˈʋaːs]; Slovene: Iga vas, German: Iggendorf) is a settlement south of Stari Trg in the Municipality of Loška Dolina in the Inner Carniola region of Slovenia.

== Name ==
The name Iga vas is believed to be connected with the Slovene common noun igo 'yoke', referring to the layout of the village in the 18th century. If so, the name literally means 'yoke village'.
