= Šmarata =

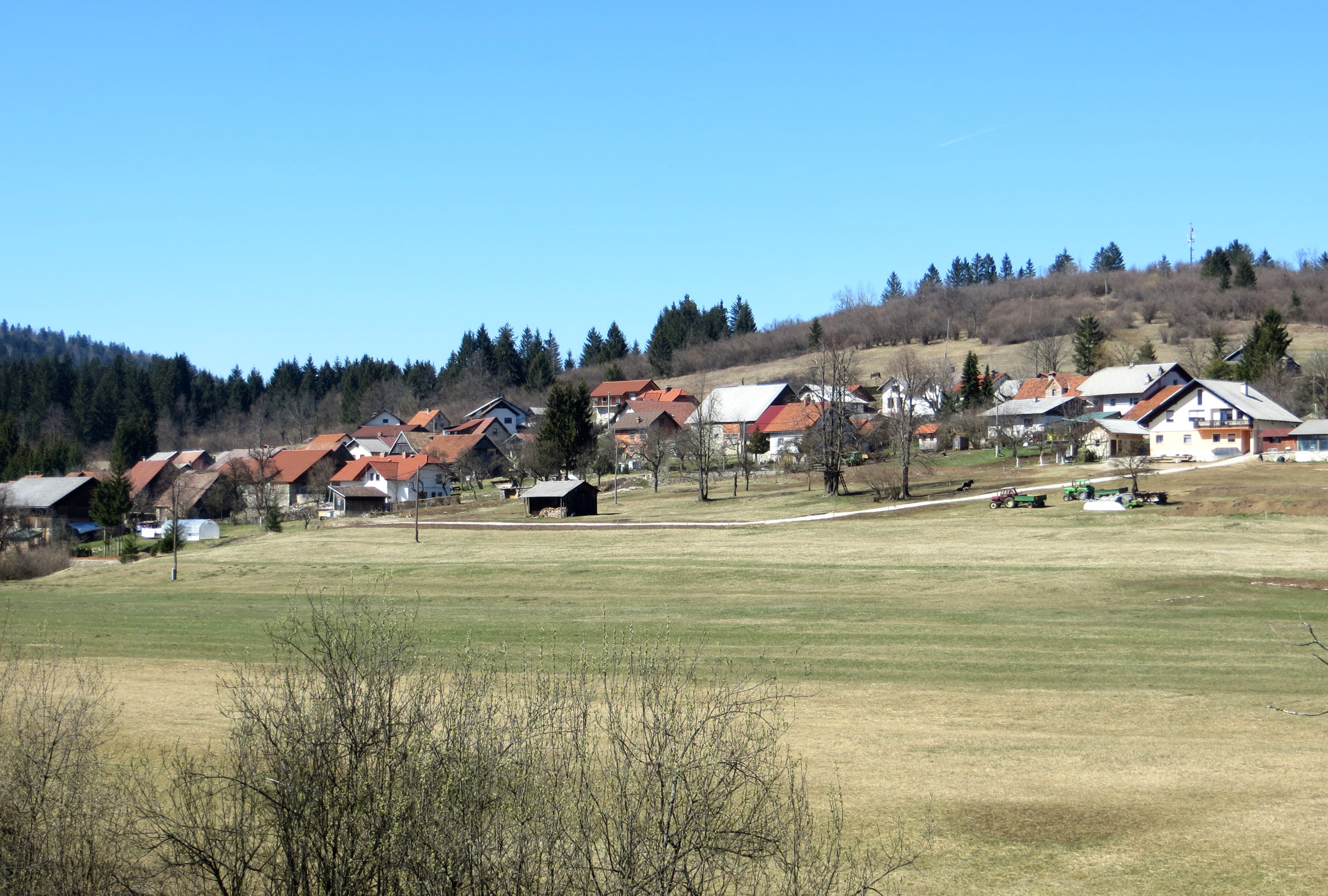

- Location in Slovenia
- Coordinates: 45°41′21.88″N 14°28′1.78″E
- Country: Slovenia
- Traditional region: Inner Carniola
- Statistical region: Littoral–Inner Carniola
- Municipality: Loška Dolina

Area
  - Total: 2.07 km^{2} (0.80 sq mi)
- Elevation: 578.3 m (1,897 ft)

Population (2002)
  - Total: 97

Šmarata (pronounced [ʃmaˈɾaːta], German: Sankt Margarethen, Italian: Santa Margherita (di Olisa)) is a village south of Stari Trg pri Ložu in the Municipality of Loška Dolina in the Inner Carniola region of Slovenia.

== Name ==
Šmarata was attested in written records in 1275 as villa S. Margarite (and as circa sanctam Margareta in 1327, and Sand Margreten pey Sneperch in 1363). The name Šmarata is a contraction of *Š(ent)-Margareta 'Saint Margaret' (with development of Margareta > Marjeta), referring to the local church. In the local dialect, the village is known as Šmorata.

== Church ==
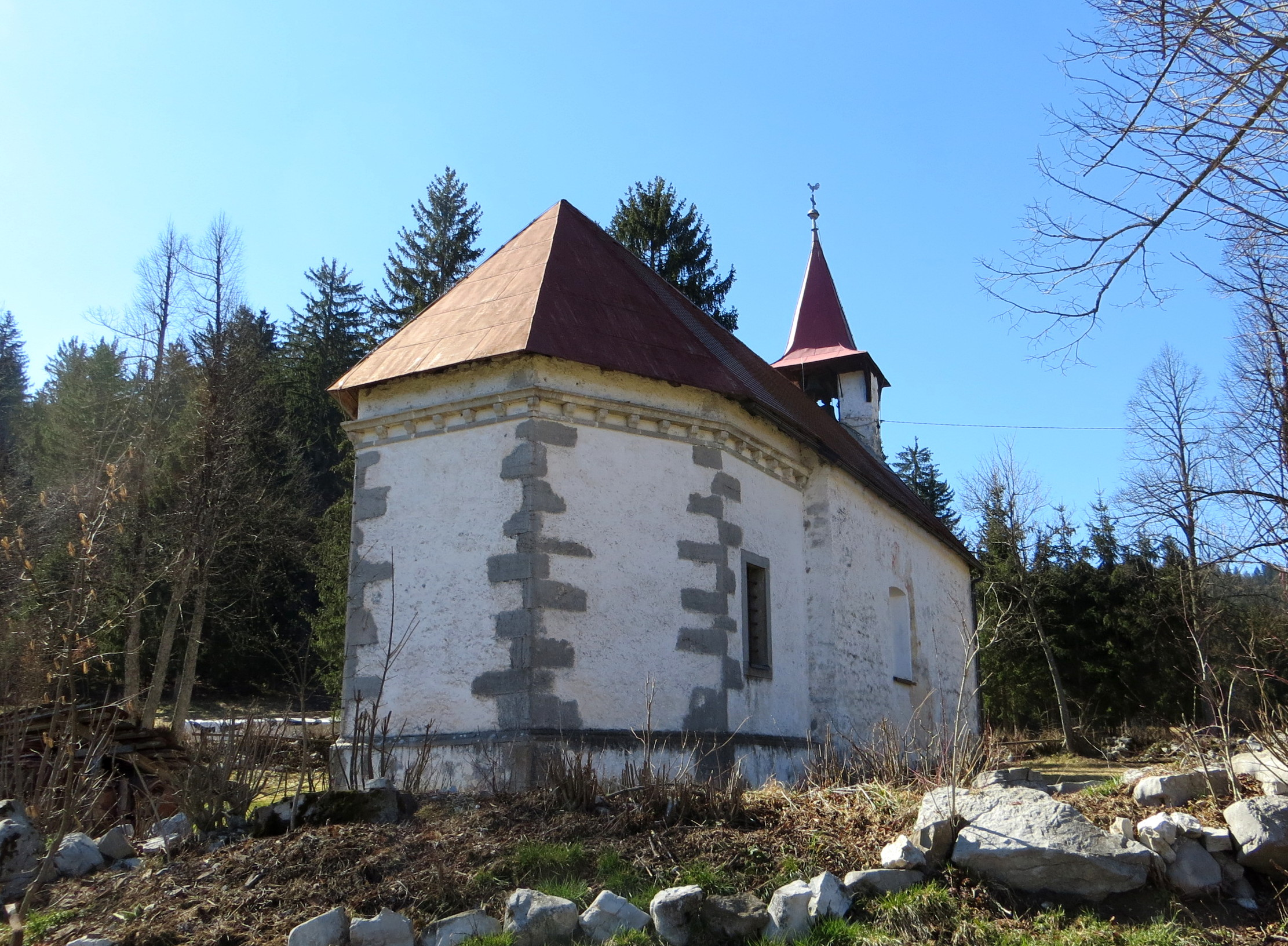
Saint Margaret's Church

The local church, from which the settlement gets its name, is dedicated to Saint Margaret (Slovene: sveta Marjeta) and belongs to the Parish of Stari Trg.
