= Podlož =

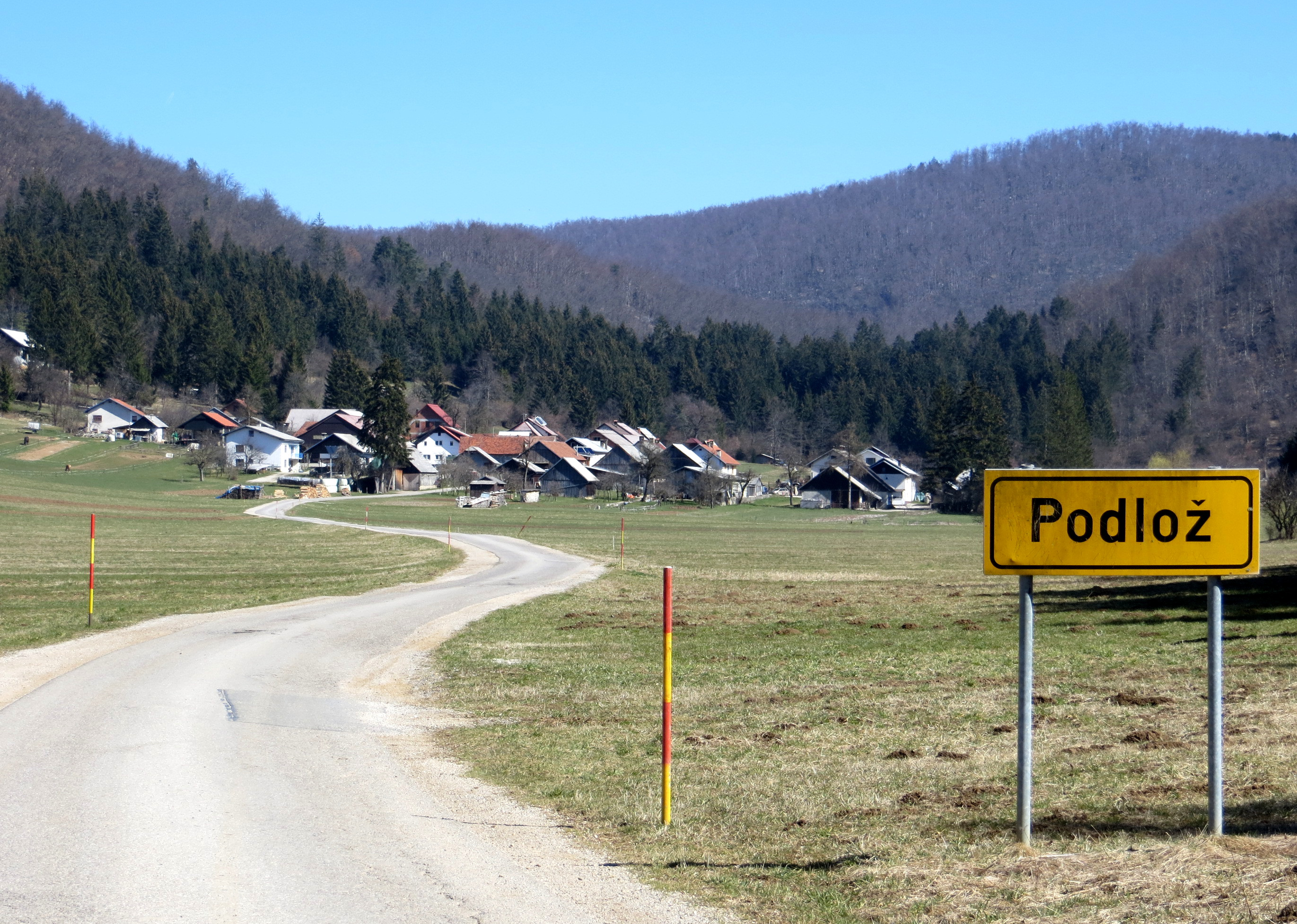

- Location in Slovenia
- Coordinates: 45°44′6.66″N 14°27′38.94″E
- Country: Slovenia
- Traditional region: Inner Carniola
- Statistical region: Littoral–Inner Carniola
- Municipality: Loška Dolina

Area
  - Total: 3.57 km^{2} (1.38 sq mi)
- Elevation: 604.2 m (1,982 ft)

Population (2002)
  - Total: 61

Podlož (pronounced [pɔˈdloːʃ], German: Podlaas) is a village north of Lož in the Municipality of Loška Dolina in the Inner Carniola region of Slovenia.

== Church ==
The local church is built on Cross Mountain (Slovene: Križna gora, German: Kreuzberg; 857 m or 2,812 ft), a hill above the settlement, and is dedicated to the Holy Cross. It belongs to the Parish of Stari Trg. It is a pilgrimage church with a series of 13 chapels representing the Stations of the Cross leading up to the main church. The church was first mentioned in written documents dating to 1526. It was rebuilt in the mid-18th century.
