= Nadlesk =

- Village
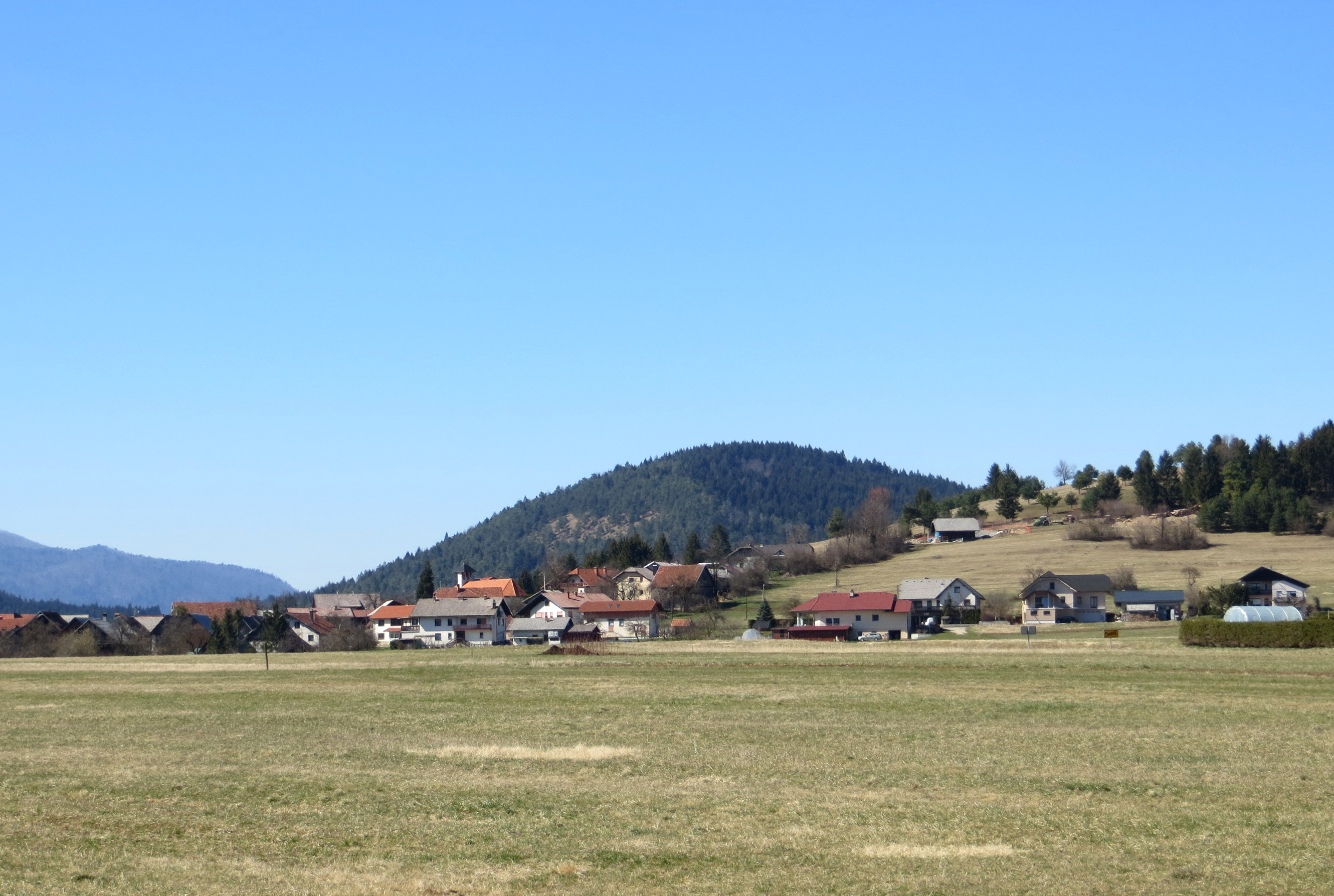

- Location in Slovenia
- Coordinates: 45°42′15.31″N 14°27′58.04″E
- Country: Slovenia
- Traditional region: Inner Carniola
- Statistical region: Littoral–Inner Carniola
- Municipality: Loška Dolina

Area
  - Total: 8.97 km^{2} (3.46 sq mi)
- Elevation: 580.3 m (1,904 ft)

Population (2002)
  - Total: 154

Nadlesk (pronounced [naˈdlɛsk], in older sources Nadlesek) is a village south of Stari Trg in the Municipality of Loška Dolina in the Inner Carniola region of Slovenia. The settlement includes the hamlets of Hrib, Sredi Vasi (Slovene: Sredi vasi), and Kot.

== History ==
On the hill above Nadlesk there are the remains of a Roman fortification and the settlement below it. Almost the entire village burned down in 1932, after which new houses were built. During the Second World War, Allied aircraft landed near Nadlesk to supply Partisan forces with weapons and to evacuate the wounded.

== Church ==
The local church in the settlement is dedicated to Saint Gertrude (Slovene: sveta Jedrt) and belongs to the Parish of Stari Trg. It has a coffered painted wooden ceiling from 1723 and frescoes dating to 1511. The frescoes are the work of Tomaž of Senj (fl. ca. 1511). The church's carved wooden head of John the Baptist dates to the 13th century and is the oldest object of its type in Europe; the artwork is now held by the National Gallery in Ljubljana.

== Notable people ==
Notable people that were born or lived in Nadlesk include:

- Jože Žnidaršič (1890), storyteller and photographer
