= Dolenje Poljane =

- Location in Slovenia
- Coordinates: 45°41′33.09″N 14°31′12.58″E
- Country: Slovenia
- Traditional region: Inner Carniola
- Statistical region: Littoral–Inner Carniola
- Municipality: Loška Dolina

Area
  - Total: 8.4 km^{2} (3.2 sq mi)
- Elevation: 874.5 m (2,869 ft)

Population (2002)
  - Total: 8

Dolenje Poljane (pronounced [doˈleːnjɛ pɔˈljaːnɛ], German: Unterpölland, Italian: Pogliane Inferiore) is a settlement in the hills southeast of Stari Trg pri Ložu in the Municipality of Loška Dolina in the Inner Carniola region of Slovenia. The area also includes the hamlet of Zgornje Poljane (German: Oberpölland, Italian: Pogliane Supperiore).

The chapel in Dolenje Poljane is dedicated to Our Lady of Sorrows. The church in Zgornje Poljane is built on a hill (1,065 meters or 3,494 feet) and is dedicated to Saint Andrew. Both belong to the Parish of Stari Trg.
