= Vrhnika pri Ložu =

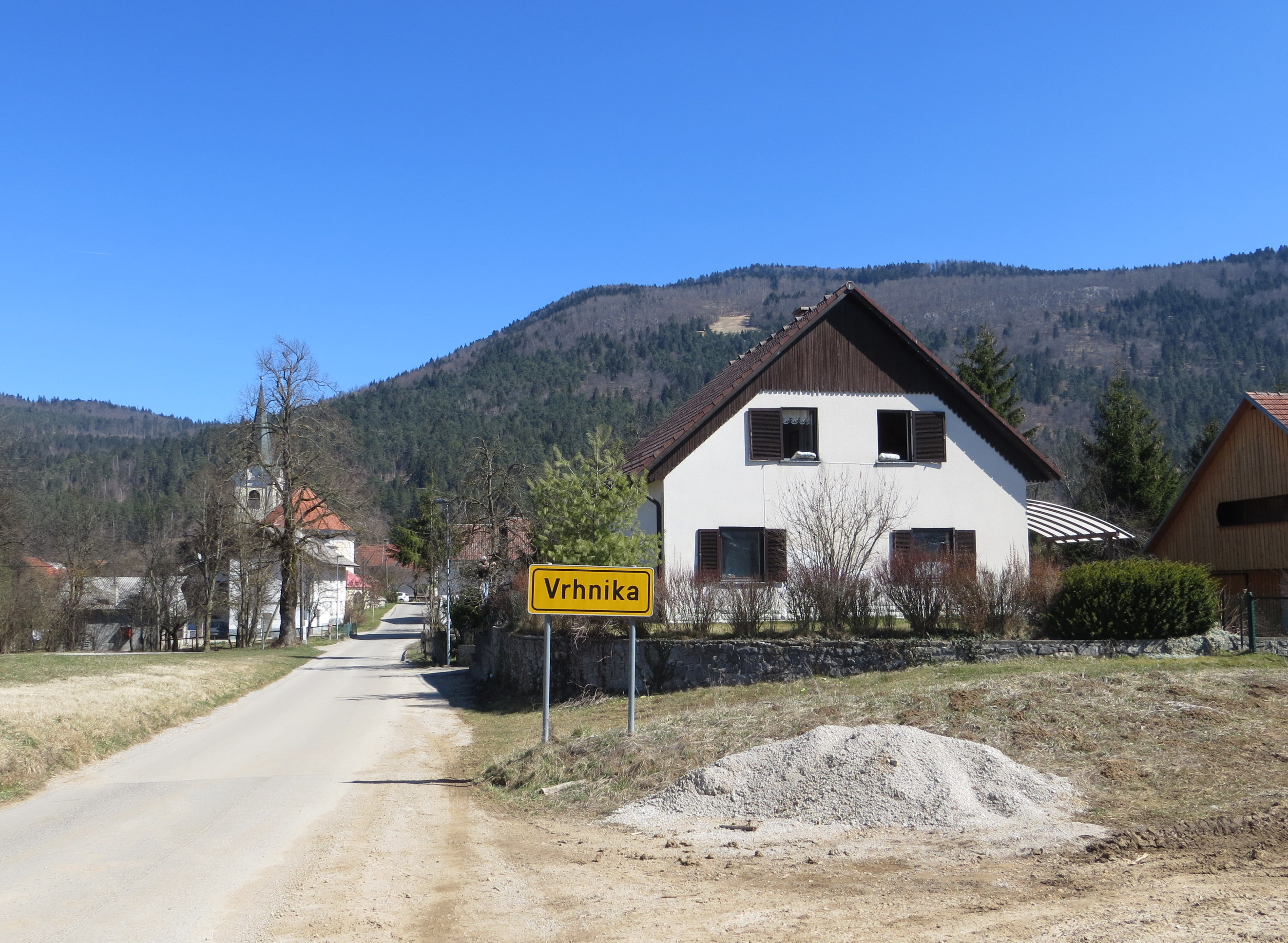

- Location in Slovenia
- Coordinates: 45°42′15.63″N 14°30′19.97″E
- Country: Slovenia
- Traditional region: Inner Carniola
- Statistical region: Littoral–Inner Carniola
- Municipality: Loška Dolina

Area
  - Total: 9.53 km^{2} (3.68 sq mi)
- Elevation: 582.3 m (1,910 ft)

Population (2002)
  - Total: 149

Vrhnika pri Ložu (pronounced [ˈʋəɾxnika pɾi ˈloːʒu], German: Werchnik) is a village southeast of Stari Trg in the Municipality of Loška Dolina in the Inner Carniola region of Slovenia.

== Church ==
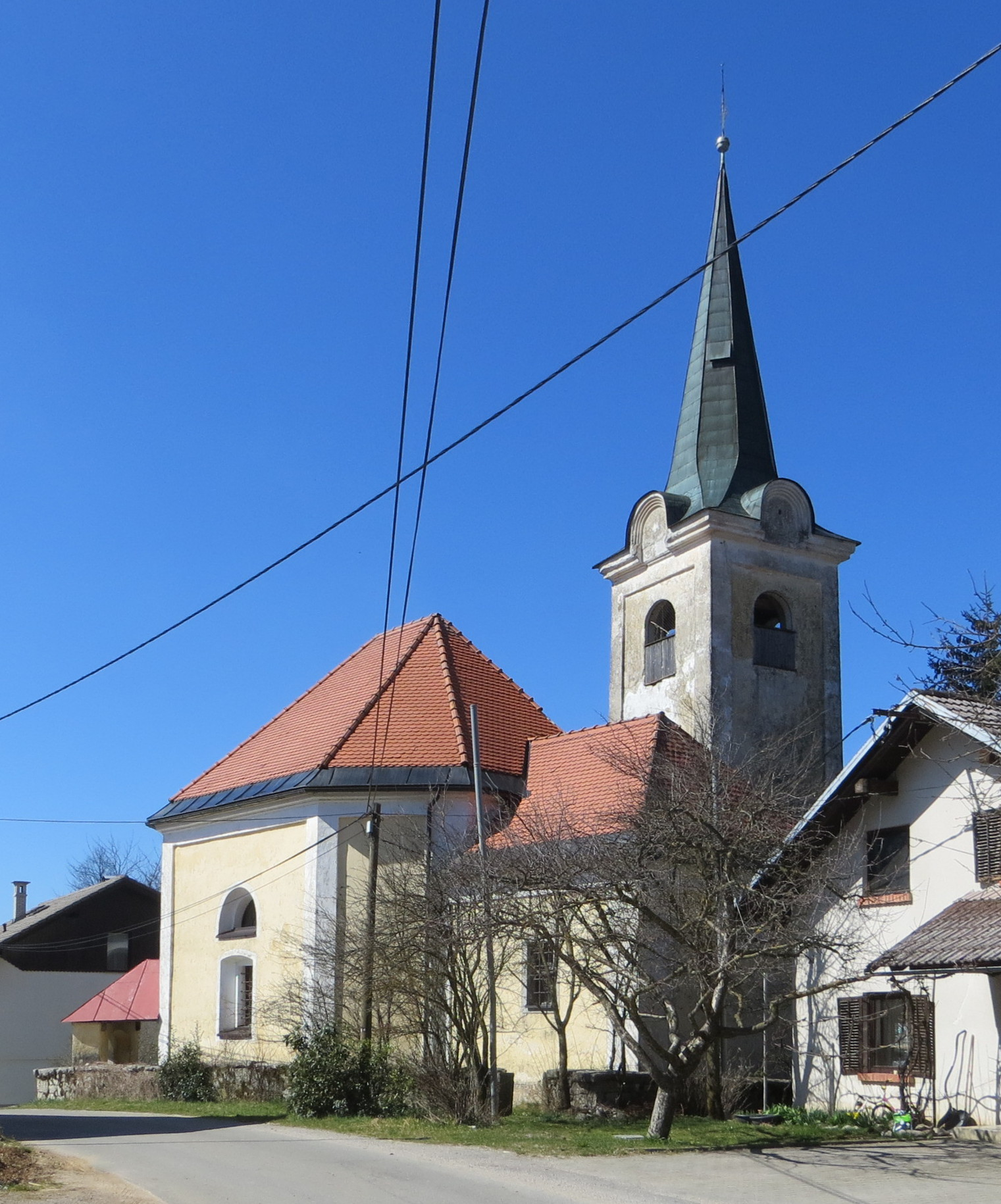
Saint Francis Xavier Church

The local church in the settlement is dedicated to Saint Francis Xavier and belongs to the Parish of Stari Trg. Its construction was begun in 1735.

== Notable people ==
Notable people that were born or lived in Vrhnika pri Ložu include:

- Feliks Razdrih (a.k.a. Stane, 1901–?), communist politician
