= Viševek =

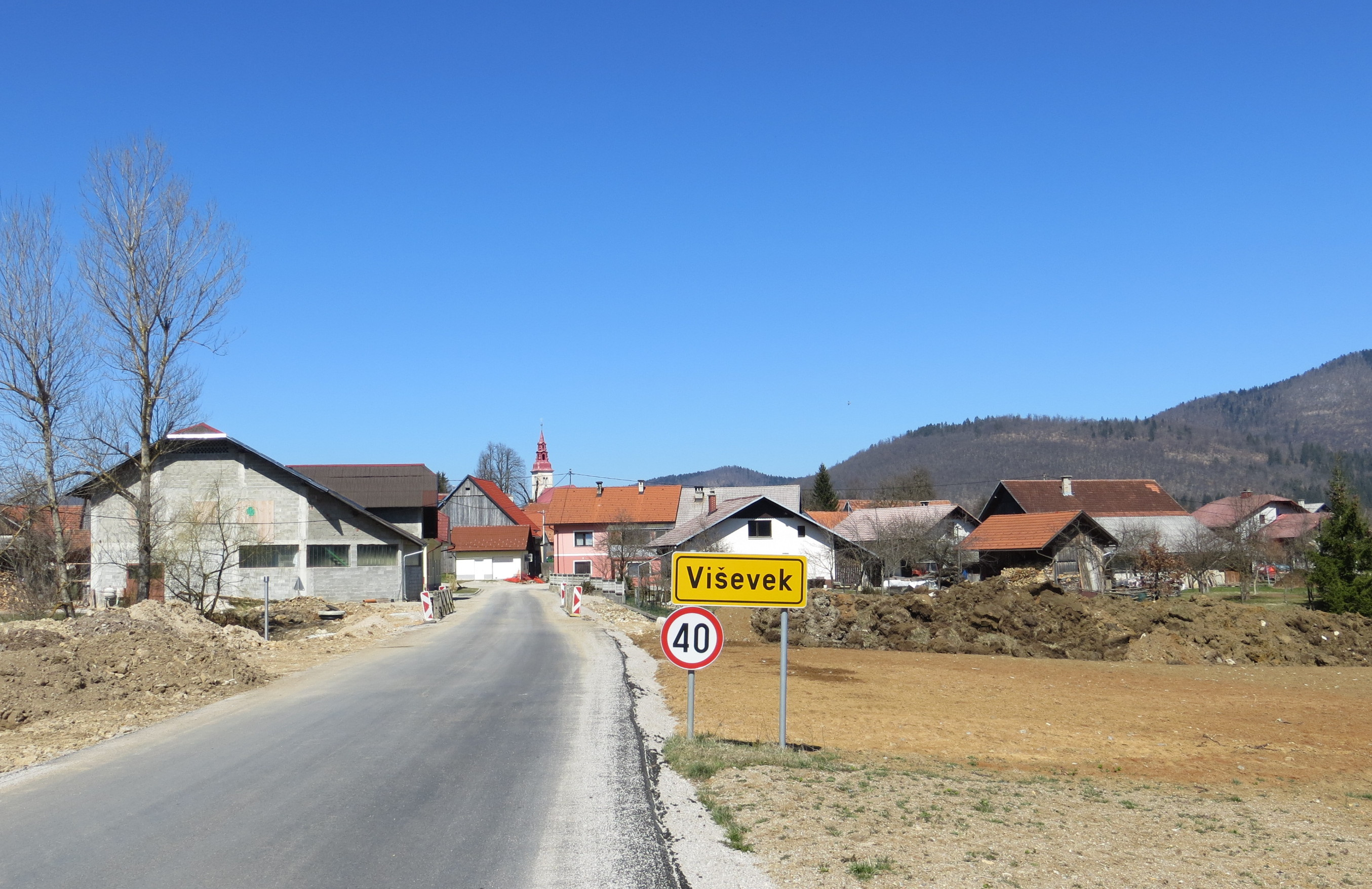

- Location in Slovenia
- Coordinates: 45°42′1.72″N 14°29′11.21″E
- Country: Slovenia
- Traditional region: Inner Carniola
- Statistical region: Littoral–Inner Carniola
- Municipality: Loška Dolina

Area
  - Total: 1.99 km^{2} (0.77 sq mi)
- Elevation: 578.3 m (1,897 ft)

Population (2002)
  - Total: 155

Viševek (pronounced [ʋiˈʃeːʋək], in older sources Uševek, German: Uscheuk) is a village south of Stari Trg pri Ložu in the Municipality of Loška Dolina in the Inner Carniola region of Slovenia.

== Geography ==
Viševek includes the hamlet of Bajer (in older sources also Bajar, German: Waier) east of the village center. The word bajer means 'pond' in Slovene, and the hamlet is located next to a small pond.

== Church ==
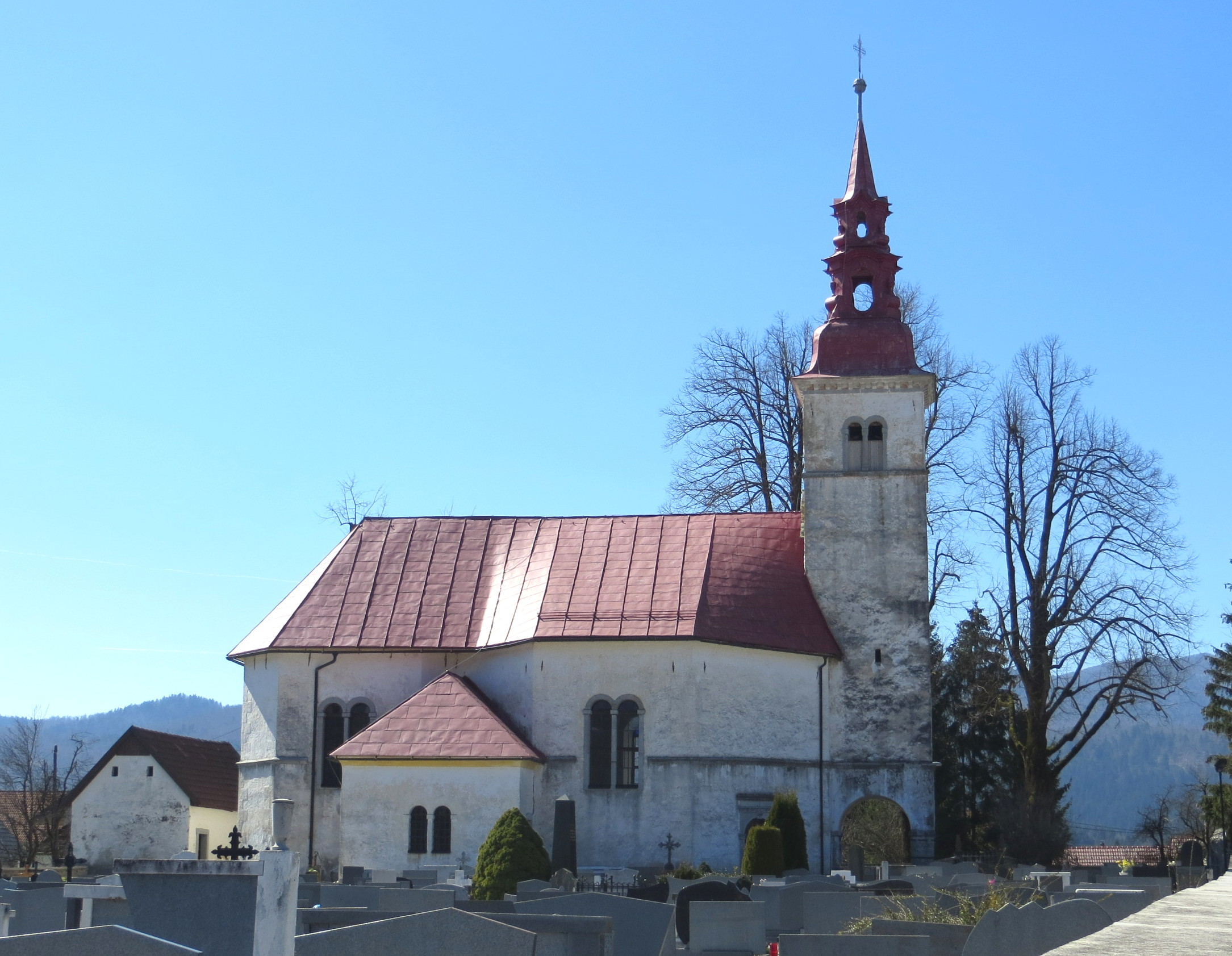
Assumption Church

The local church in the settlement is dedicated to the Assumption of Mary and belongs to the Parish of Stari Trg.
