= Babna Polica =

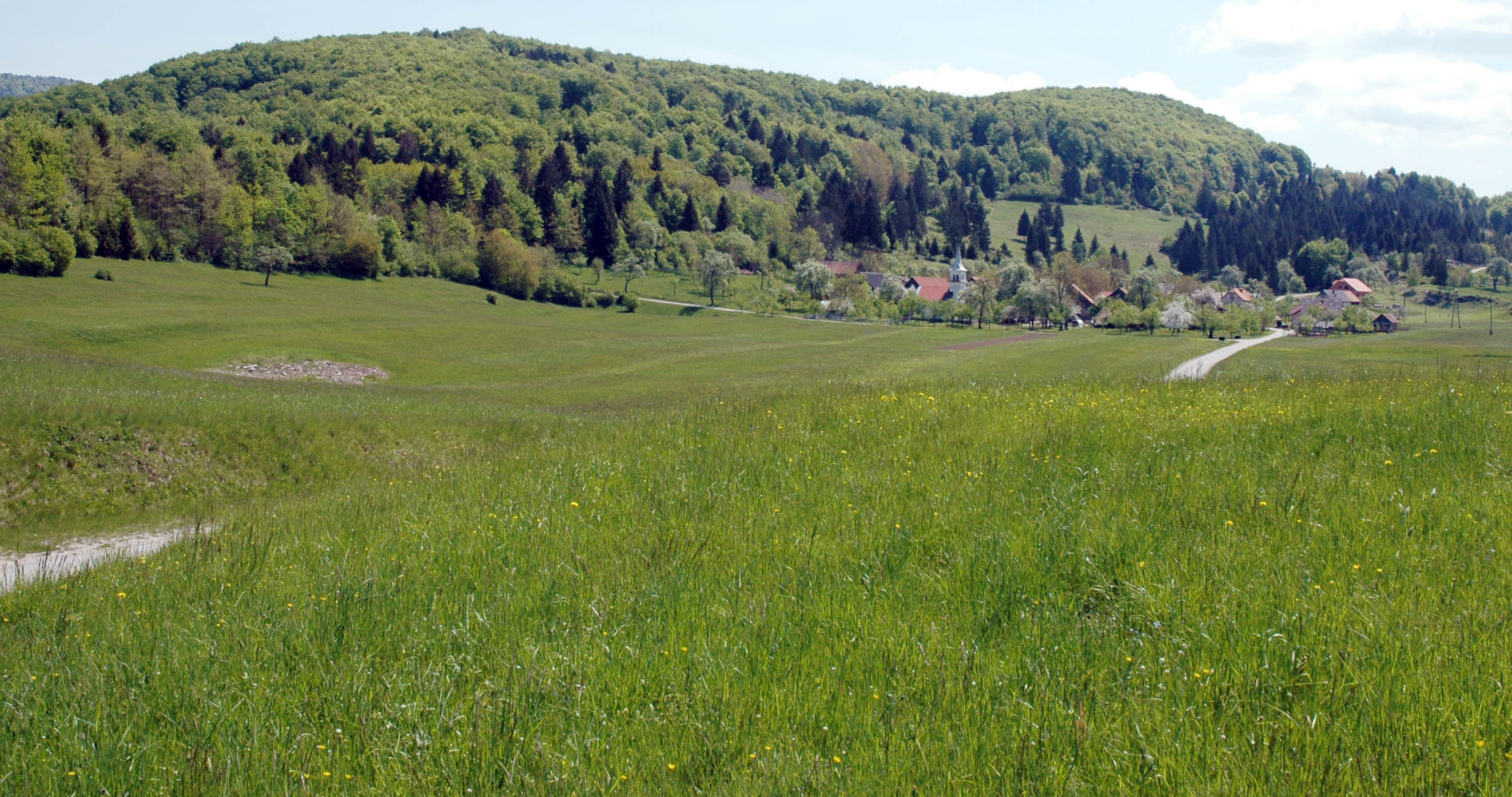

- Location in Slovenia
- Coordinates: 45°40′7.38″N 14°30′27.1″E
- Country: Slovenia
- Traditional region: Inner Carniola
- Statistical region: Littoral–Inner Carniola
- Municipality: Loška Dolina

Area
  - Total: 12.35 km^{2} (4.77 sq mi)
- Elevation: 756.3 m (2,481 ft)

Population (2002)
  - Total: 11

Babna Polica (pronounced [ˈbaːbna pɔˈliːtsa]; in older sources also Babina Polica, German: Babnapoliza) is a small village southeast of Stari Trg pri Ložu in the Municipality of Loška Dolina in the Inner Carniola region of Slovenia.

== Name ==
Babna Polica was attested in historical sources as Polz in 1327, Poͤlcz in 1355, and Pabenfelder Poltz in 1384, among other spellings.

== Church ==
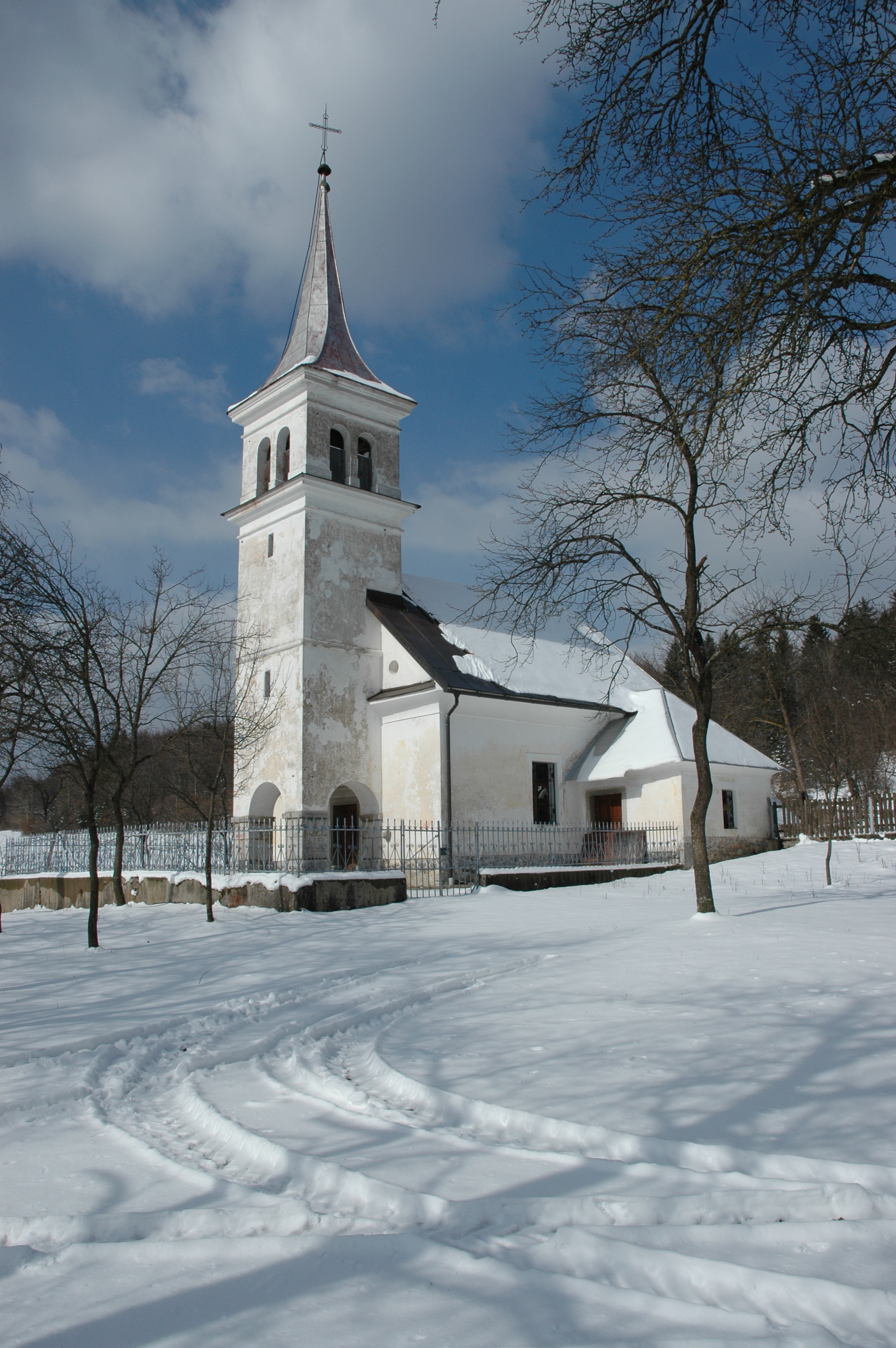
Church in Babna Polica

The local church on the northern edge of the settlement is dedicated to Saint Anthony the Hermit and belongs to the Parish of Stari Trg. It was first mentioned in written sources dating to 1403. The date on the door casing, 1589, indicates a late 16th-century rebuilding of the original church. The main altar dates to 1716.
