= Sveta Ana =

Sveta Ana (lit. "Saint Anne") may refer to:

- Sveta Ana pri Ložu, a village in the Municipality of Loška Dolina, southern Slovenia
- Sveta Ana v Slovenskih Goricah, a village in the Municipality of Sveta Ana, northeastern Slovenia
- Municipality of Sveta Ana, a municipality in northeastern Slovenia
- Sveta Ana, Croatia, a village near Đurđevac, Croatia
- Stari Grad, Makole, a village in Slovenia known as Sveta Ana until 1955
