= Obrh =

Obrh may refer to:

- Obrh (creek), a stream in Slovenia
- Obrh, Croatia, a village near Ribnik
