= Dane, Loška Dolina =

Dane
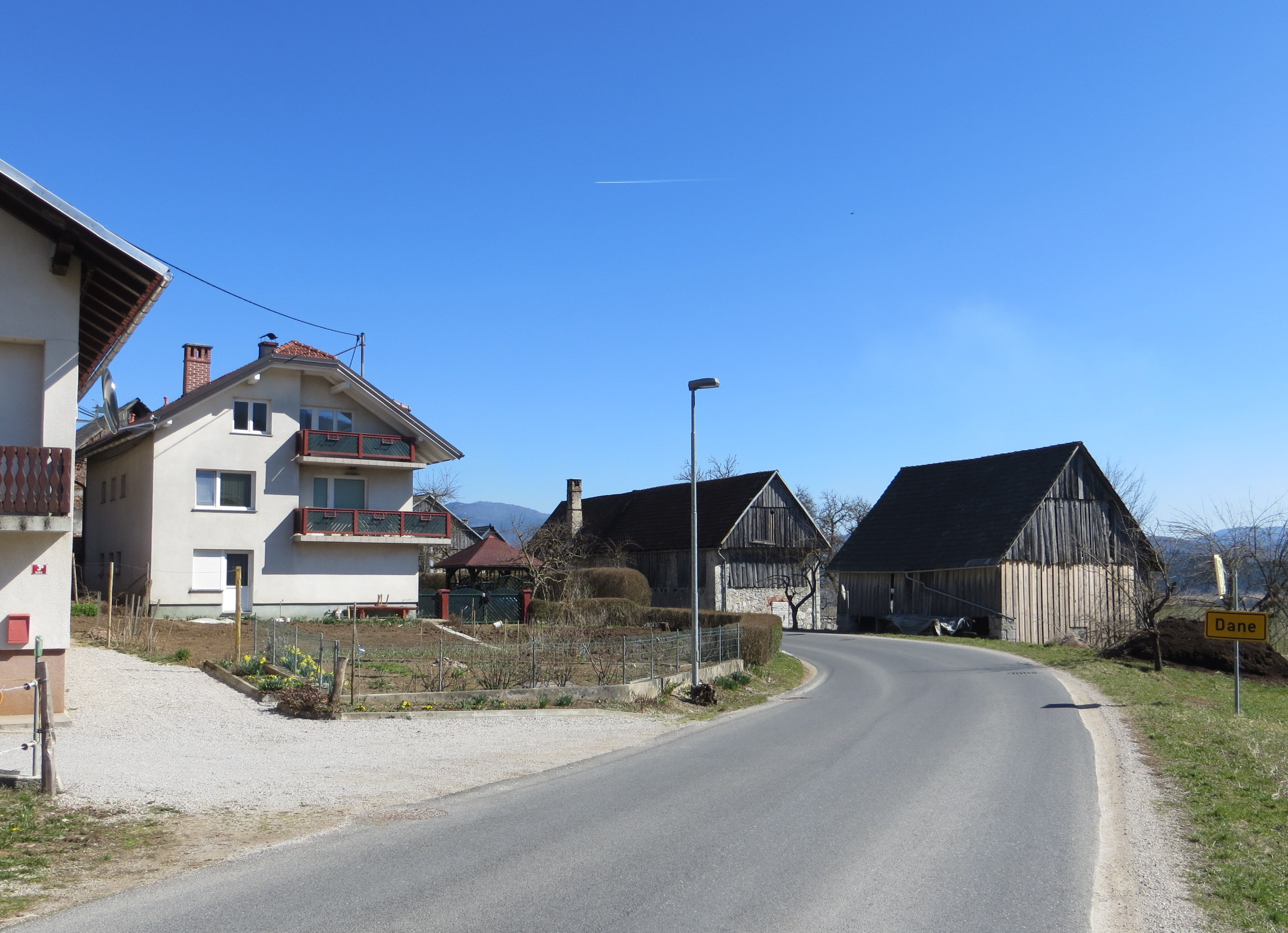

- Location in Slovenia
- Coordinates: 45°42′44.44″N 14°26′42.85″E
- Country: Slovenia
- Traditional region: Inner Carniola
- Statistical region: Littoral–Inner Carniola
- Municipality: Loška Dolina

Area
  - Total: 14.29 km^{2} (5.52 sq mi)
- Elevation: 578.7 m (1,899 ft)

Population (2002)
  - Total: 111

Dane (pronounced [ˈdaːnɛ]) is a village in the Municipality of Loška Dolina in the Inner Carniola region of Slovenia, on the border with Croatia.

== Churches ==
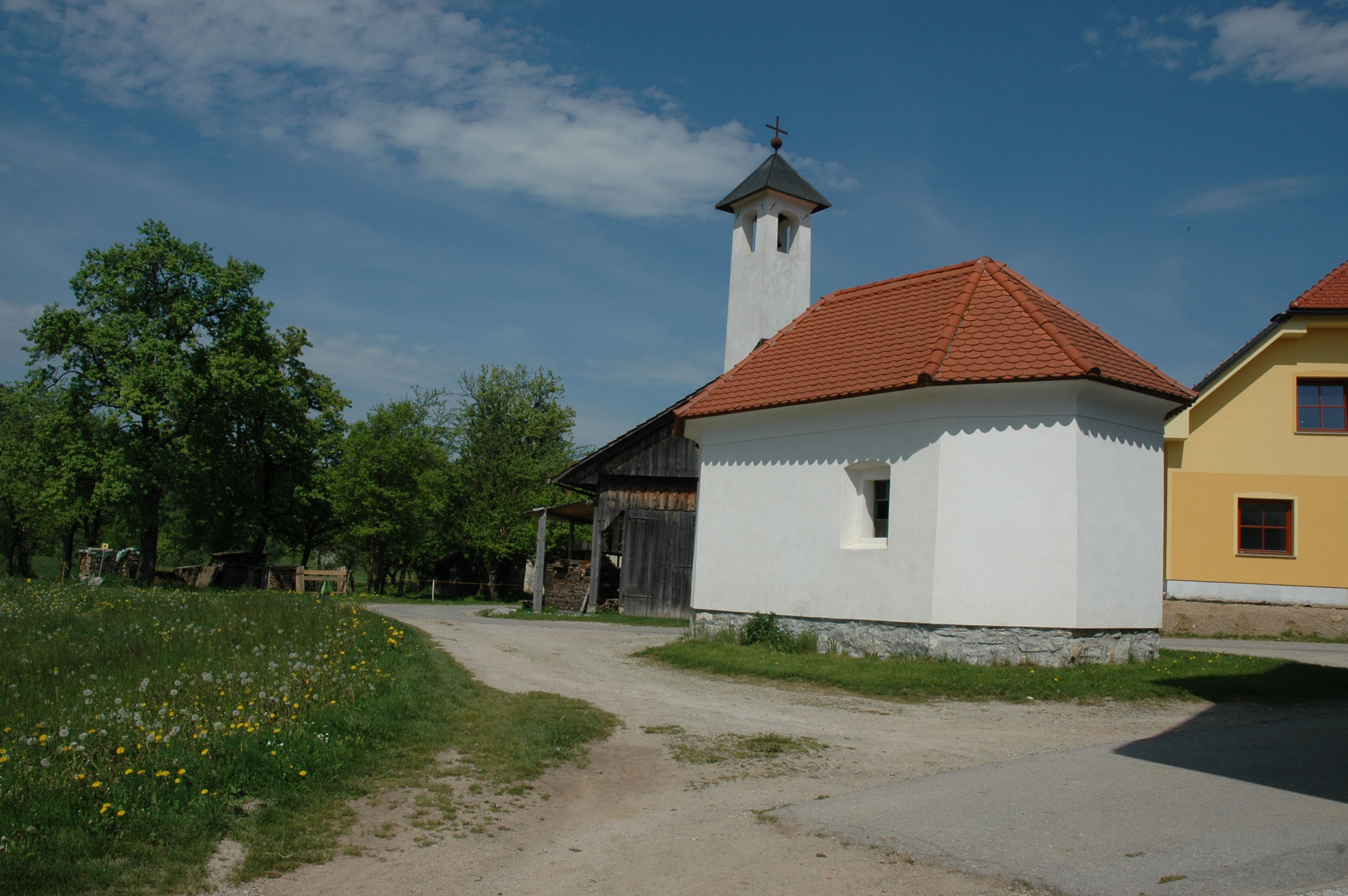
Saint Isidore's Chapel

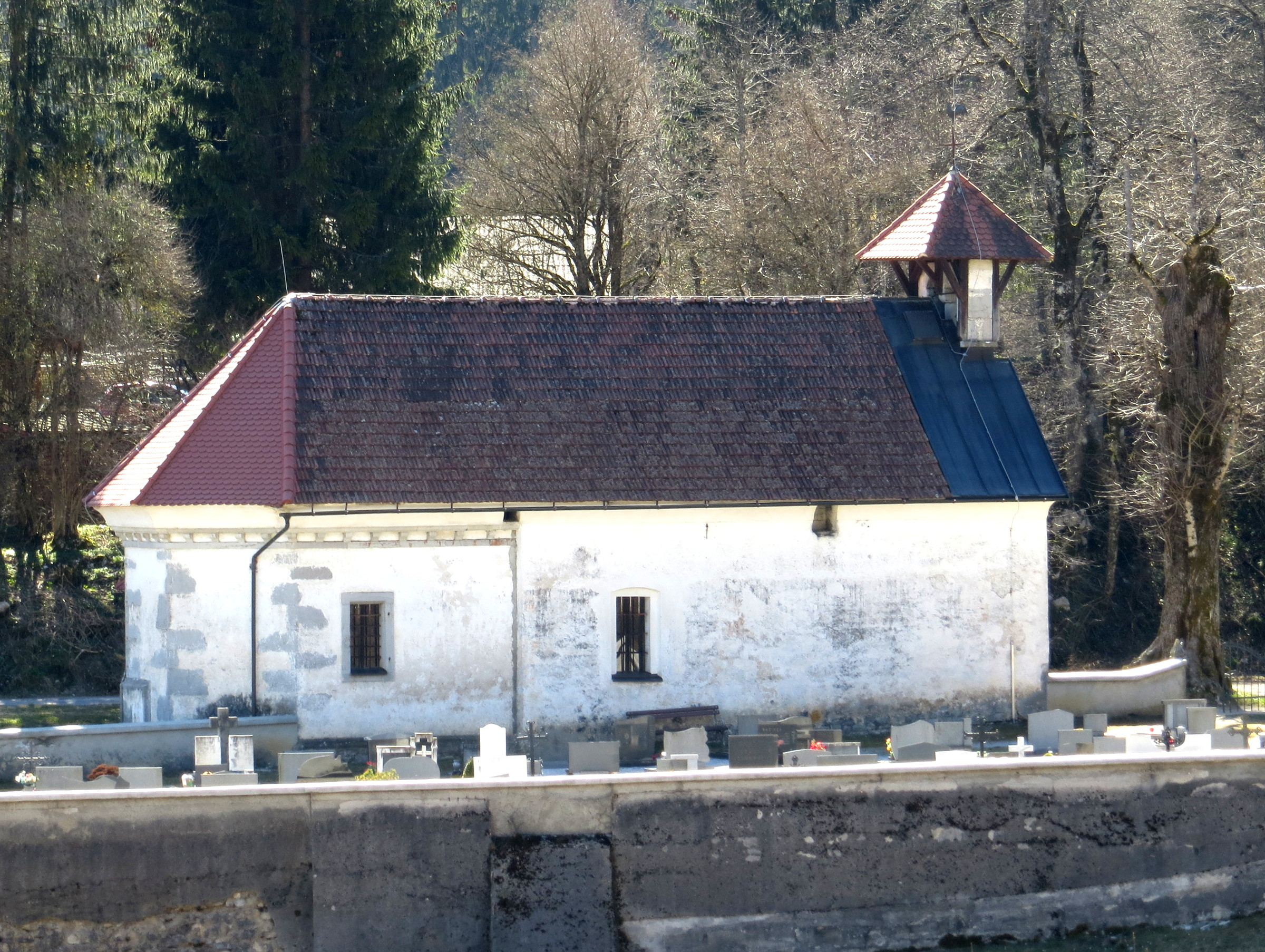
Saint Urban's Church

Churches

There is a small chapel in the settlement dedicated to Saint Isidore. The main church is built outside the village to the west and is dedicated to Saint Urban. Both belong to the Parish of Stari Trg. The chapel is a late 18th-century octagonal building. The church was first mentioned in written documents dating to 1526 and was rebuilt in the Baroque style in 1693.

== History ==
Dane is a place where Slovene civilian hostages were killed and photographed by Italian soldiers on 31 July 1942 after the annexation by Fascist Italy, like in many other villages in the Province of Ljubljana, at the time a common policy ordered by Mario Roatta in his "Circolare 3C." The photo has been claimed several times by the Italian media (most recently in a 2012 talk show broadcast by the Italian state-owned TV station RAI, which caused a diplomatic protest from the Slovenian Ministry of Foreign Affairs) as manipulated and false evidence to the contrary (i.e., Slovene partisans killing Italian civilians) in the context of foibe remembrance day in Italy.
