= Obrh (creek) =

Obrh Creek
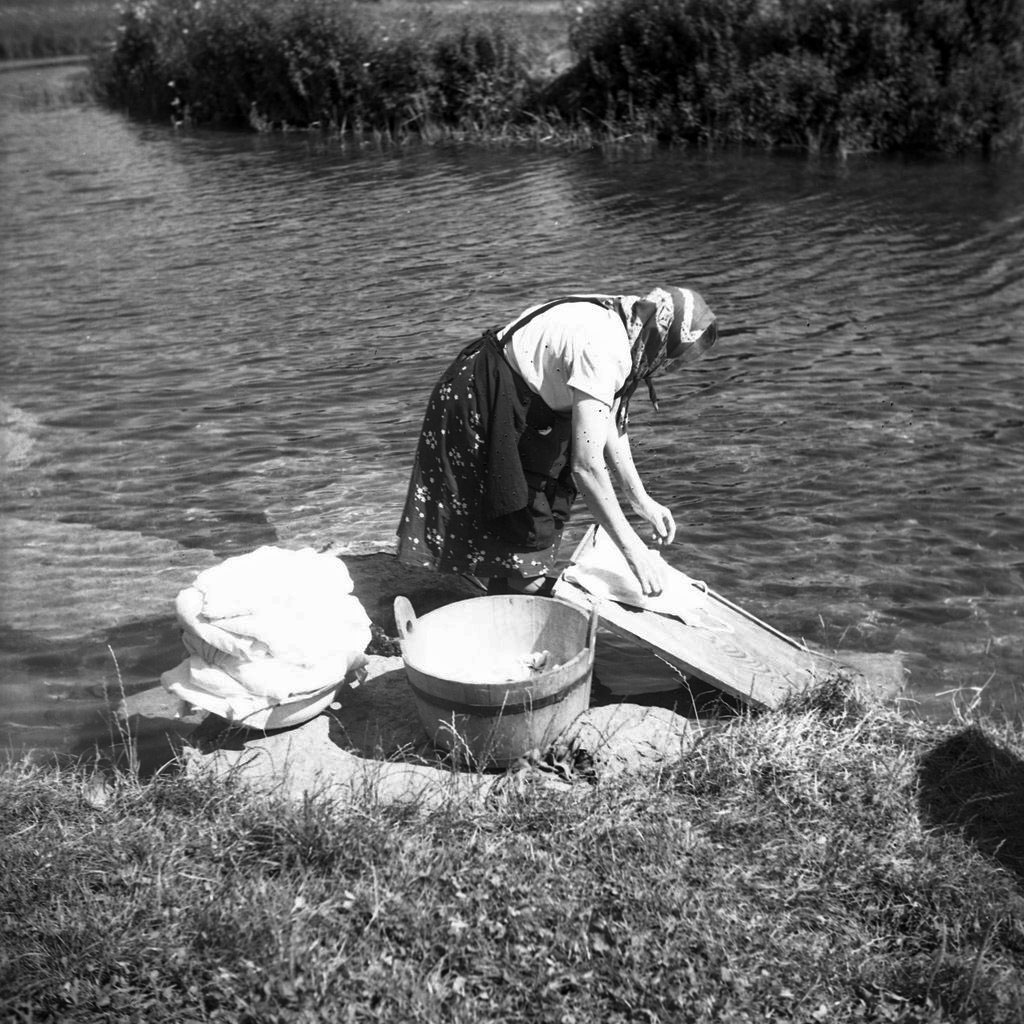
- Washing clothes in Obrh Creek in 1962

Location
- Country: Slovenia

Physical characteristics
- Source
  - location: Little Obrh Creek (Slovene: Mali Obrh)
  - coordinates: 45°40′24.68″N 14°28′45.57″E
- 2nd source
  - location: Big Obrh Creek (Slovene: Velki Obrh)
  - coordinates: 45°41′59.63″N 14°30′40.93″E
- Mouth
  - location: Sinks into Golobina Cave in the Lož Karst Field

Basin features
- Progression: Stržen→ Rak→ Unica→ Ljubljanica→ Sava→ Danube→ Black Sea

Obrh Creek (pronounced [ˈoːbəɾx]) is a losing stream that originates and terminates in the Lož Karst Field in the Municipality of Loška Dolina. It is a watercourse in the Ljubljanica watershed. It is created by the confluence of Little Obrh Creek (Slovene: Mali Obrh) and Big Obrh Creek (Slovene: Veliki Obrh); the latter is fed by two tributaries: Brežiček Creek and Viševek Brežiček Creek (Slovene: Viševski Brežiček). The confluence, at which point it is simply named Obrh, lies west of the village of Pudob. In the northwest, limestone part of the karst field, Obrh Creek starts to drain into many sinkholes, and higher water flows into 850-meter (2,790 ft) Golobina Cave. The stream re-emerges at the spring of the Stržen River 2 kilometers (1.2 mi) to the northwest on the southeast edge of the Cerknica Karst Field.

== Name ==
The name Obrh comes from the Slovene common noun obrh, referring to a powerful karst spring that usually surfaces below a cliff, creating a small deep lake that flows into a valley. The noun is originally a fused prepositional phrase, *ob vьrxъ 'at the summit' (i.e., at the highest point of the watercourse).
