= Lož =

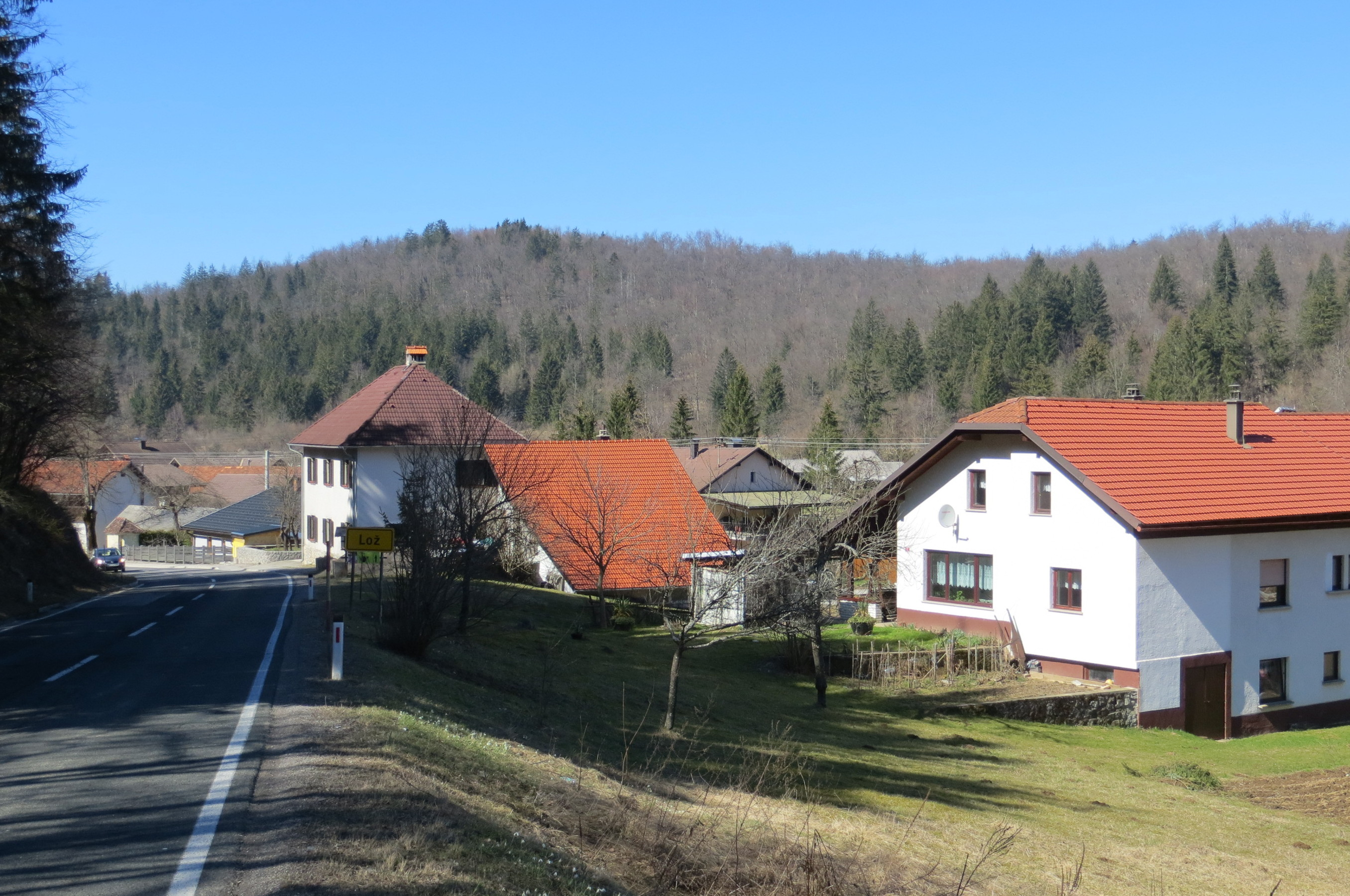

- Location in Slovenia
- Coordinates: 45°43′33.43″N 14°28′7.47″E
- Country: Slovenia
- Traditional region: Inner Carniola
- Statistical region: Littoral–Inner Carniola
- Municipality: Loška Dolina

Area
  - Total: 6.52 km^{2} (2.52 sq mi)
- Elevation: 589.7 m (1,935 ft)

Population (2002)
  - Total: 539

Lož (pronounced [ˈloːʃ], German: Laas, Italian: Olisa) is a settlement in the Municipality of Loška Dolina in the Inner Carniola region of Slovenia.

== Name ==
Originally the settlement that is now Stari Trg pri Ložu was called Lož, but in 1341 a new settlement was begun around Lož Castle and the name of the older settlement as well as its market rights were adopted by the new settlement. The older settlement began to be referred to as Stari trg (literally, 'old market town' in Slovene; German: Altenmarkt).

Lož was attested in historical sources as Los in 1220, Lossi between 1221 and 1251, Loc in 1260, Loͤs in 1341, and Las in 1440, among other spellings. The Italian name Olisa dates back at least to the 1880s.

== History ==
The new settlement of Lož around Lož Castle was granted town privileges in 1477.

== Churches ==
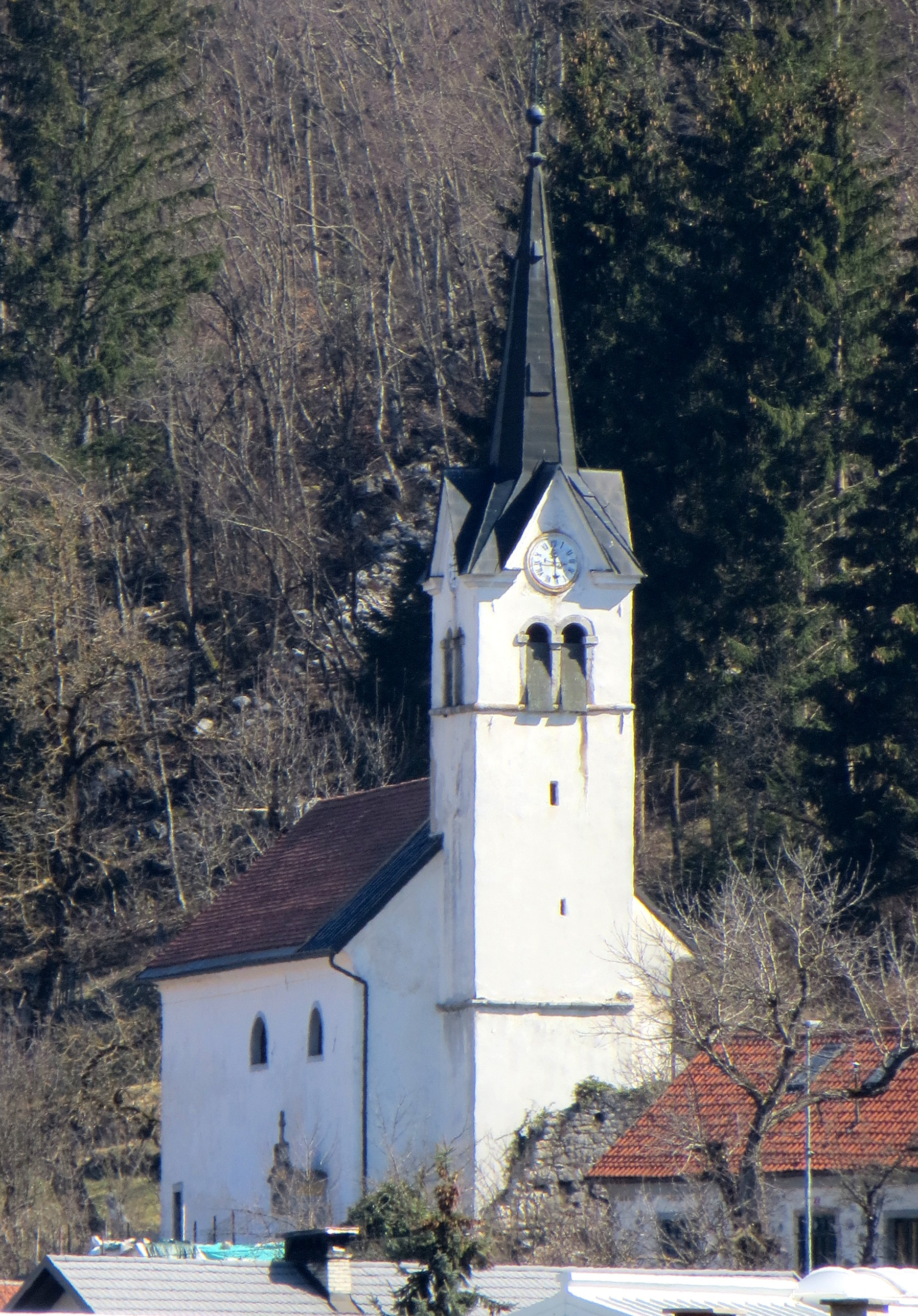
Saints Peter and Paul Church

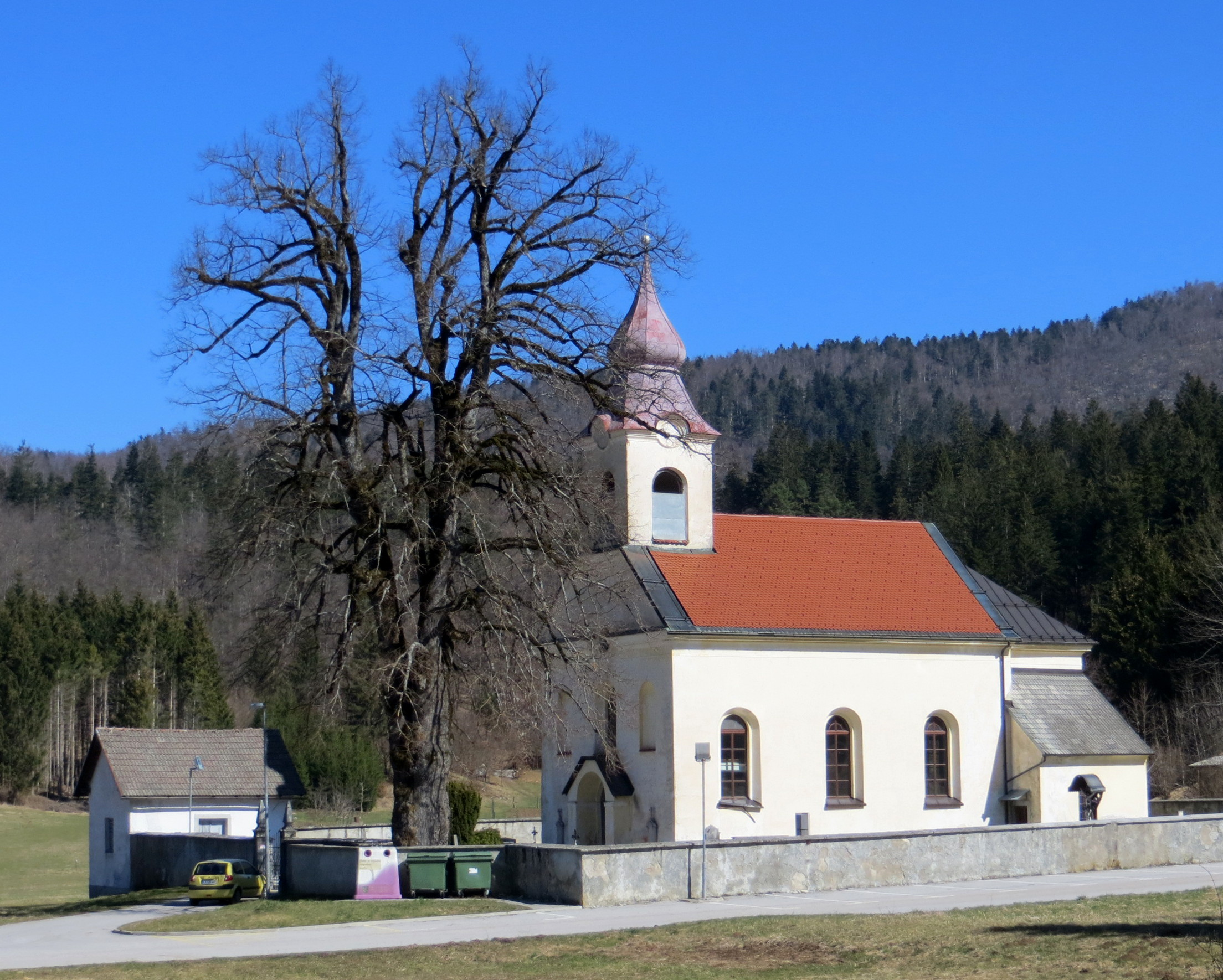
Saint Roch's Church

Churches in Lož

There are two churches in the settlement. The church in the centre of the town is dedicated to Saints Peter and Paul. It was first mentioned in written documents dating to 1428. During Ottoman raids in the late 15th century the church was fortified and a wall was built around the town. The second church is outside the town at the cemetery and is dedicated to Saint Roch. It was built in 1635 after an oath by locals in a 1631 outbreak of bubonic plague.
