= Markovec =

- Village
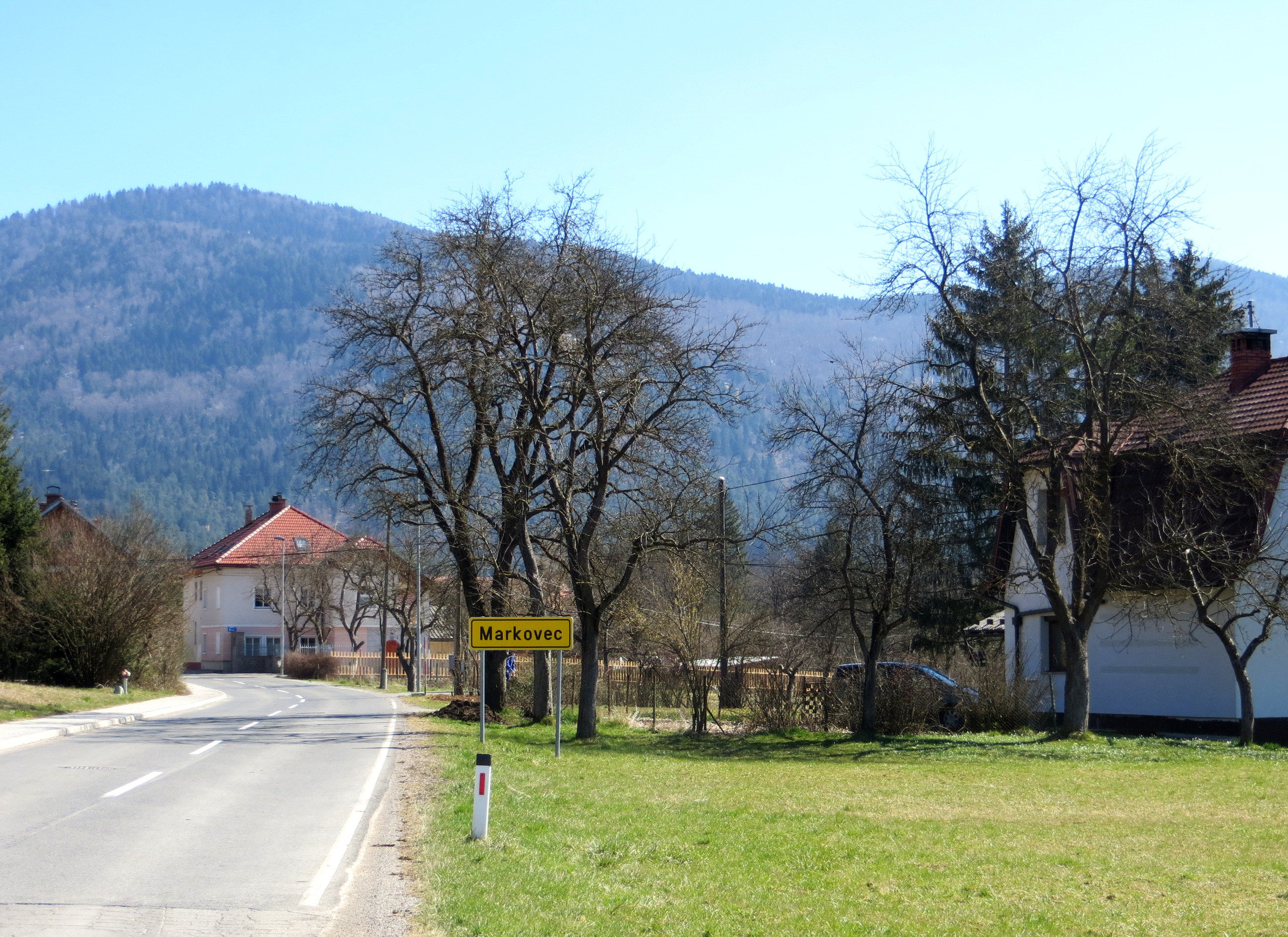

- Location in Slovenia
- Coordinates: 45°42′45.54″N 14°29′30.69″E
- Country: Slovenia
- Traditional region: Inner Carniola
- Statistical region: Littoral–Inner Carniola
- Municipality: Loška Dolina

Area
  - Total: 1.34 km^{2} (0.52 sq mi)
- Elevation: 583.2 m (1,913 ft)

Population (2002)
  - Total: 205

Markovec (pronounced [ˈmaːɾkɔʋəts]) is a settlement east of Stari Trg in the Municipality of Loška Dolina in the Inner Carniola region of Slovenia.

== Geography ==
Markovec includes the hamlets of Trzne to the west, and Podslavina and Koča Vas (Slovene: Koča Vas, in older sources Kača Vas, German: Hallerstein) to the east. Koča Vas is centered around Hallerstein Manor.

== Hallerstein Manor ==
Hallerstein Manor, also known as Koča Vas Manor (Slovene: Graščina Koča vas), stands southeast of the village center of Markovec. It is a three-story rectangular Renaissance building with a central dormer above the entryway. The manor was built by the barons of Haller von Hallerstein in the second half of the 16th century. The building was remodeled in the Baroque style after a fire in 1674.
