= Sveta Ana pri Ložu =

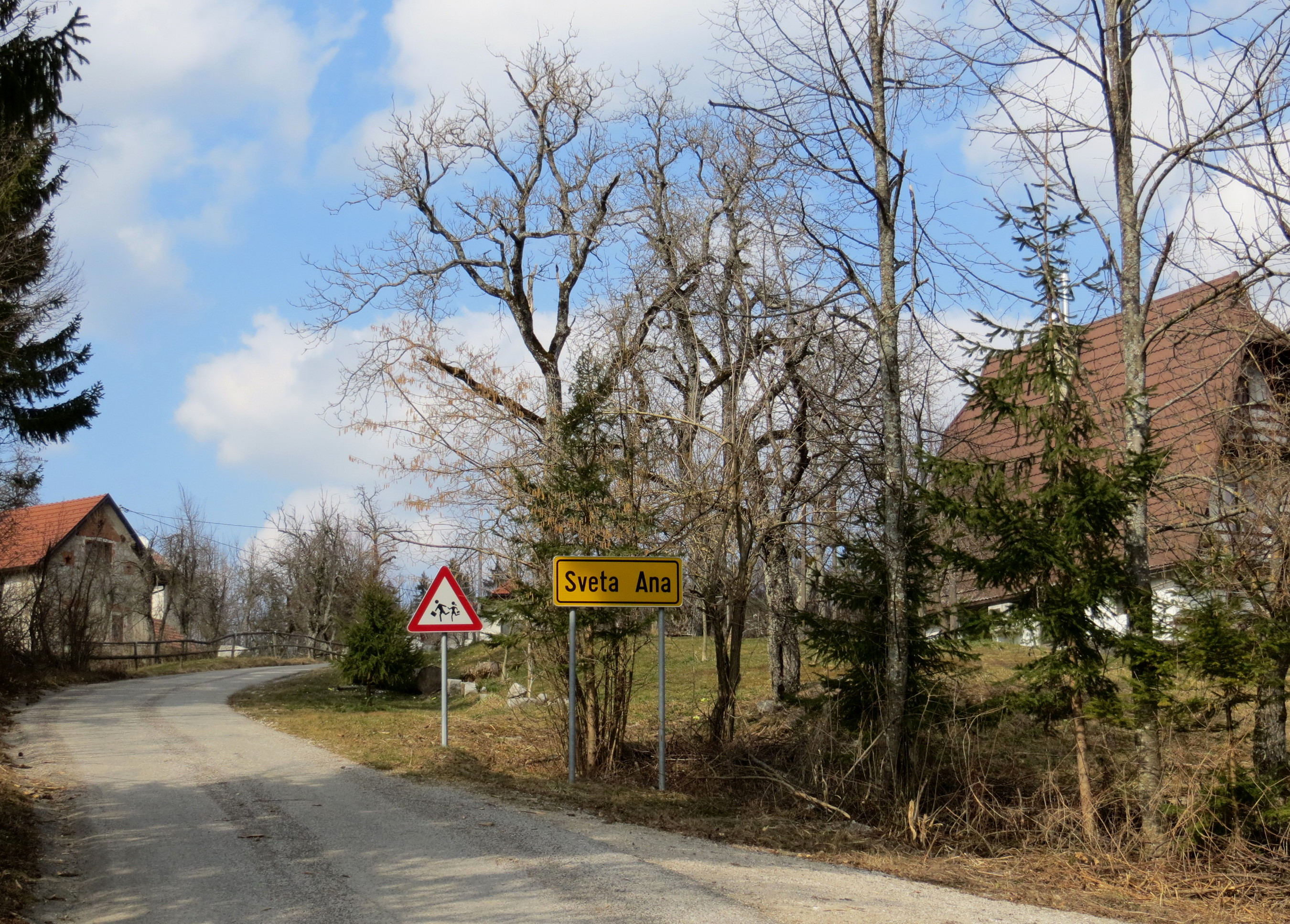

- Location in Slovenia
- Coordinates: 45°44′13.52″N 14°27′7.02″E
- Country: Slovenia
- Traditional region: Inner Carniola
- Statistical region: Littoral–Inner Carniola
- Municipality: Loška Dolina
- Elevation: 722 m (2,369 ft)

Population (2014)
  - Total: 8

Sveta Ana pri Ložu (pronounced [ˈsʋeːta ˈaːna pɾi ˈloːʒu]; German: Sankt Anna) is a village east of Podlož in the Municipality of Loška Dolina in the Inner Carniola region of Slovenia.

== History ==
A prehistoric cemetery was discovered in Sveta Ana pri Ložu, testifying to its early settlement. The oldest farm in the village is the Konte farm, dating from 1784. Sveta Ana pri Ložu was part of Podlož until 2003, when it was separated from it and made a separate village.

== Church ==
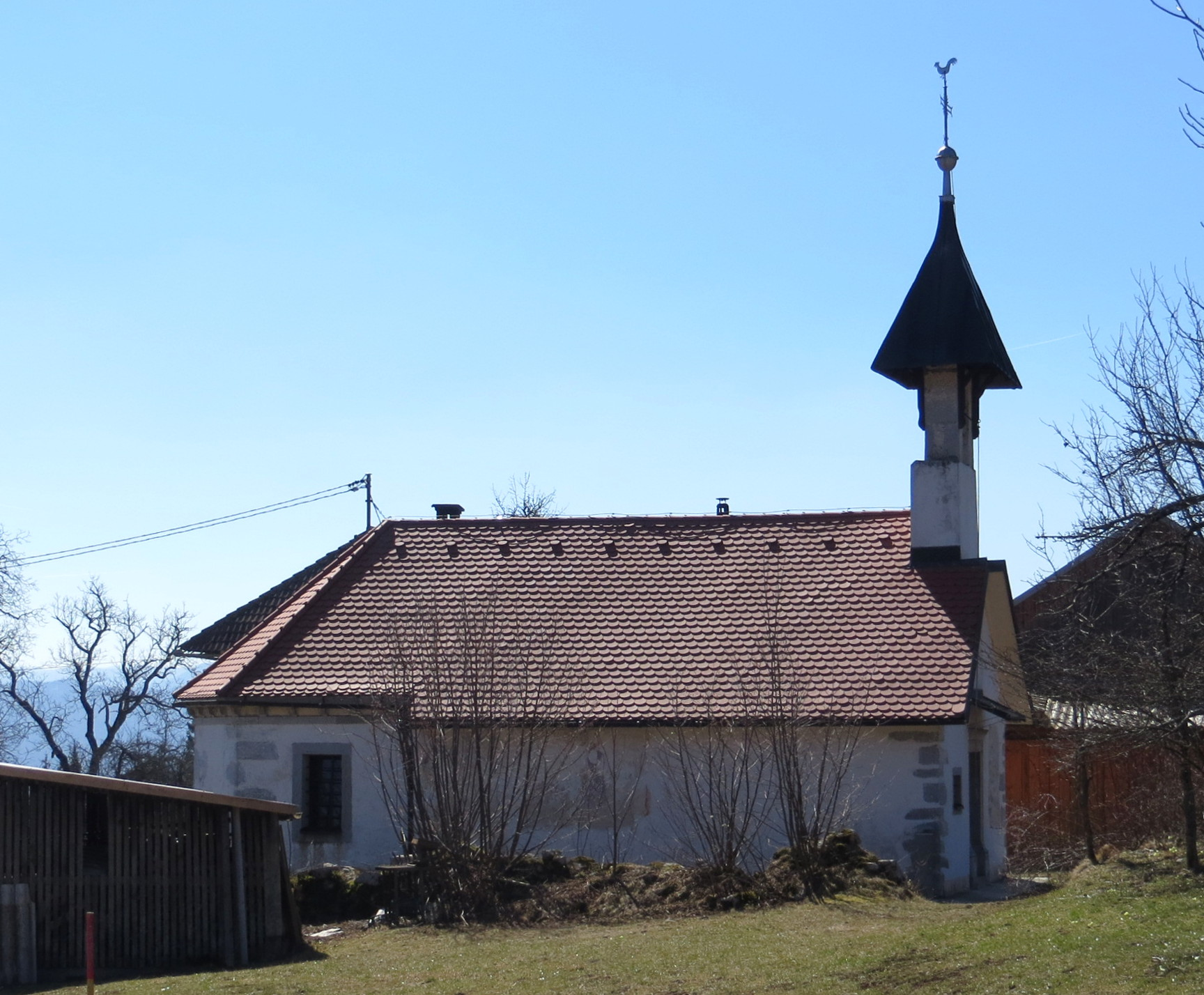
Saint Anne's Church

The village church is dedicated to Saint Anne and was built in 1526 incorporating an older structure. It has a rectangular nave, a bell-gable, and an octagonal chancel walled on three sides. The stone door casing bears the year 1672. The remains of a fresco from the early 15th century depicting Saint Christopher are found on the exterior north wall. There are pilgrims' signatures written in Glagolitic below the church's exterior fresco, indicating that pilgrims to Cross Mountain (Slovene: Križna gora) came from as far away as the Croatian coast. The priest at Cross Mountain in 1749, Mihael Rede, was a user of Glagolitic. Until the First World War, the bell-gable of Saint Anne's Church had a bell inscribed with the year 1532 and the text GOT HIELFE AUS JEGLICHER NOT 'God helps in every need.'

== Cultural heritage ==
There is a monument in the village commemorating Partisan soldiers killed in January 1945 or 1944. The plaque was set up in 1950 and was reworked in 1985.
