= Podgora pri Ložu =

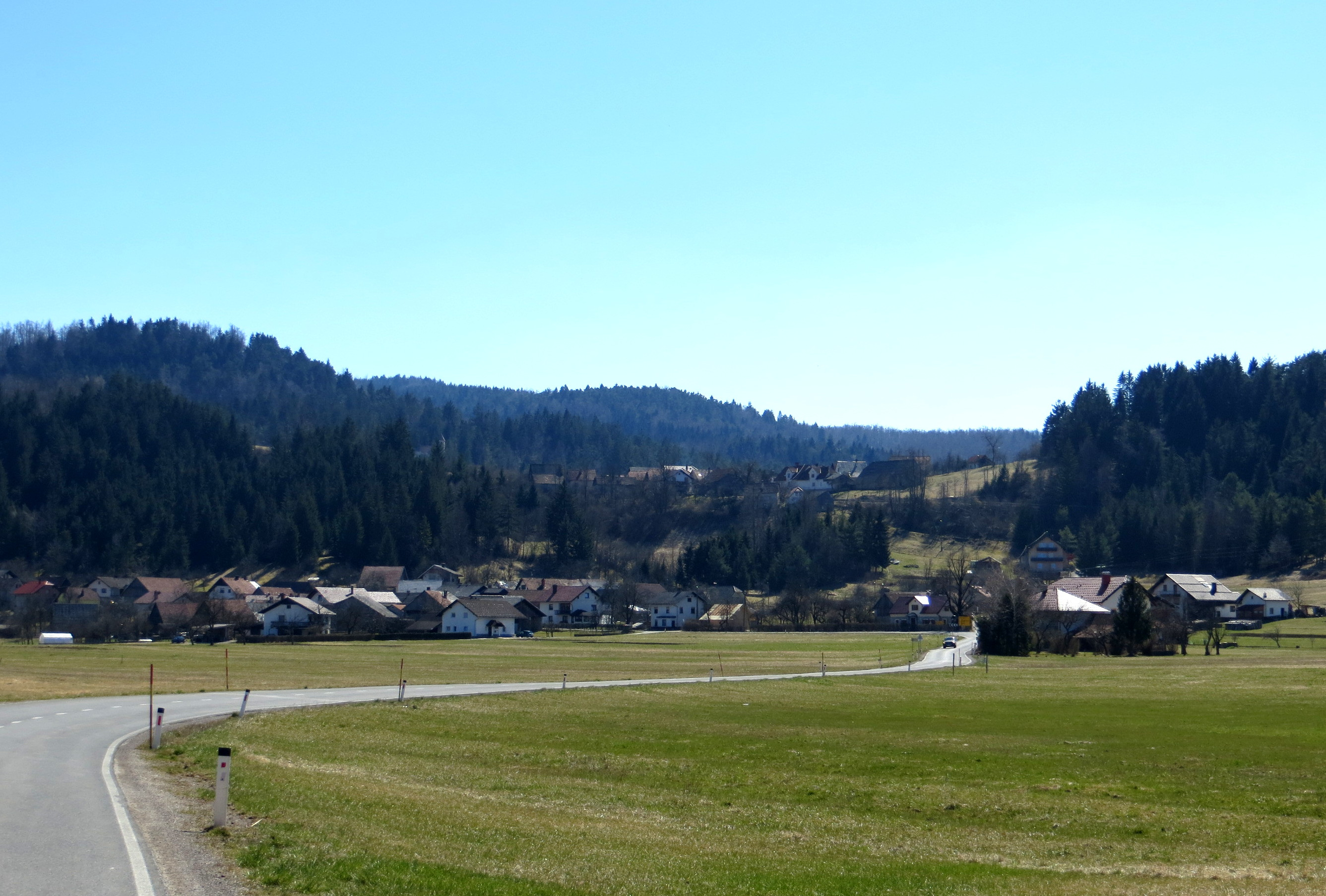

- Location in Slovenia
- Coordinates: 45°41′4.08″N 14°29′16.36″E
- Country: Slovenia
- Traditional region: Inner Carniola
- Statistical region: Littoral–Inner Carniola
- Municipality: Loška Dolina

Area
  - Total: 4.1 km^{2} (1.6 sq mi)
- Elevation: 589.1 m (1,933 ft)

Population (2002)
  - Total: 105

Podgora pri Ložu (pronounced [pɔdˈɡɔːɾa pɾi ˈloːʒu], Italian: Piedimonte d'Olisa) is a village south of Stari Trg in the Municipality of Loška Dolina in the Inner Carniola region of Slovenia.

== Name ==
The name of the settlement was changed from Podgora to Podgora pri Ložu in 1955.

== Cultural heritage ==
There is a small chapel in the settlement dedicated to the Holy Family. It was built in 1996 and belongs to the Parish of Stari Trg.
