= Municipality of Loška Dolina =

Municipality of Slovenia

Municipality of Loška Dolina Občina Loška dolina
- Municipality
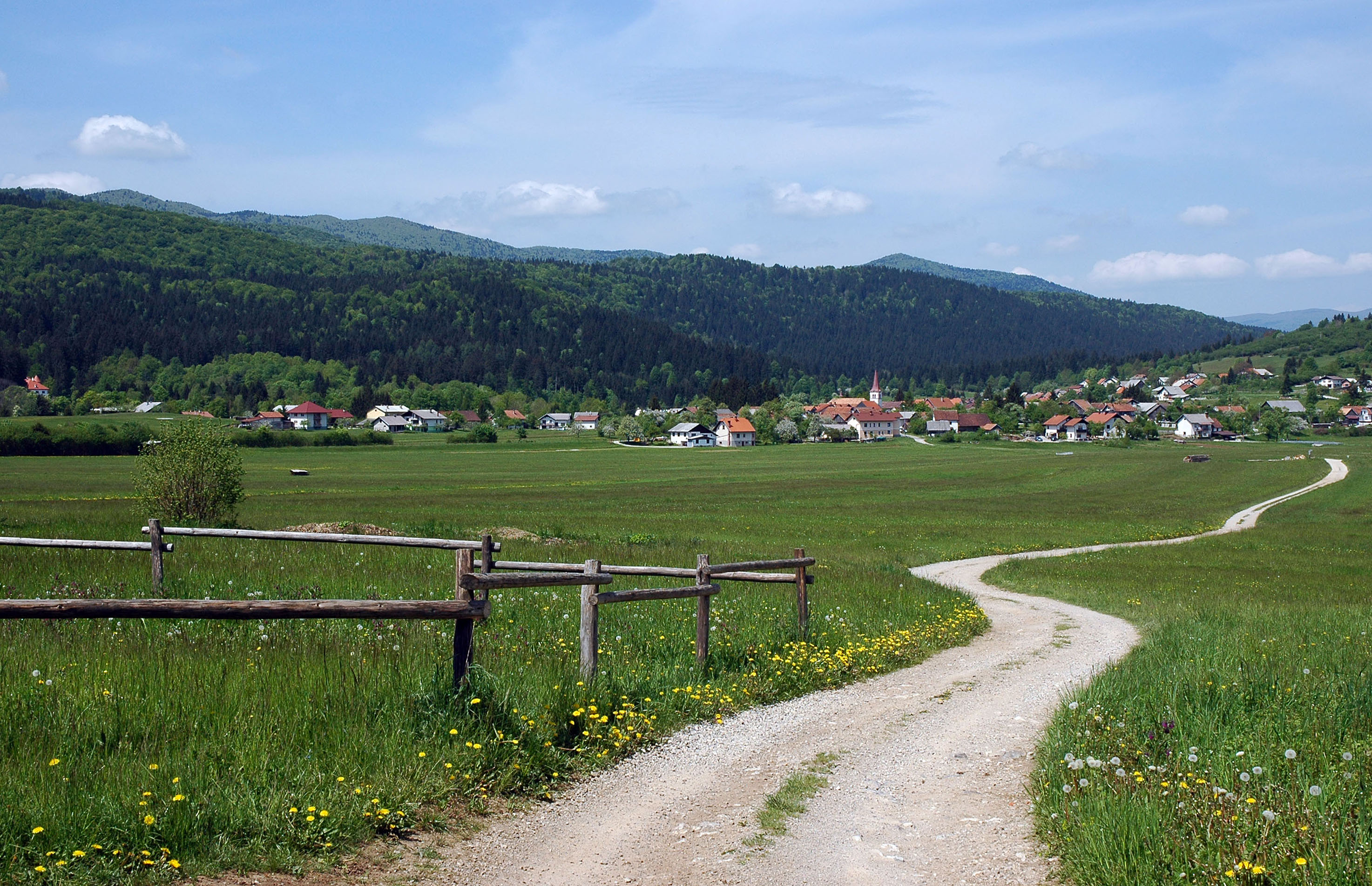
- Landscape in the Municipality of Loška Dolina

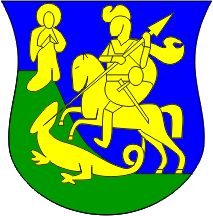
- Coat of arms

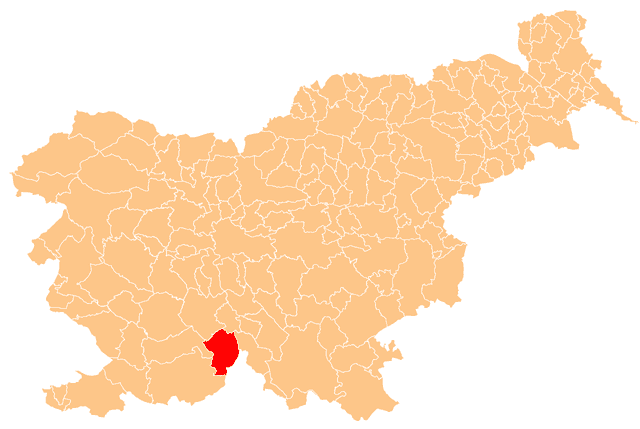
- Location of the Municipality of Loška Dolina in Slovenia
- Coordinates: 45°42′44″N 14°25′42″E
- Country: Slovenia

Government
  - Mayor: Matjaž Antončič (Independent)

Area
  - Total: 166.8 km^{2} (64.4 sq mi)

Population (2002)
  - Total: 3,640
  - Density: 21.8/km^{2} (56.5/sq mi)
- Time zone: UTC+01 (CET)
  - Summer (DST): UTC+02 (CEST)
- Website: www.loskadolina.si

The Municipality of Loška Dolina (pronounced [ˈloːʃka dɔˈliːna]; Slovene: Občina Loška dolina) is a municipality in Slovenia. It is part of the Inner Carniola traditional region. Snežnik Castle and Cross Cave are located in the municipality. Its municipal seat is the town of Stari Trg pri Ložu. It borders Croatia.

== Settlements ==
In addition to the municipal seat of Stari Trg pri Ložu, the municipality also includes the following settlements:

- Babna Polica
- Babno Polje
- Dane
- Dolenje Poljane
- Iga Vas
- Klance
- Knežja Njiva
- Kozarišče
- Lož
- Markovec
- Nadlesk
- Podcerkev
- Podgora pri Ložu
- Podlož
- Pudob
- Šmarata
- Sveta Ana pri Ložu
- Viševek
- Vrh
- Vrhnika pri Ložu
