= Pudob =

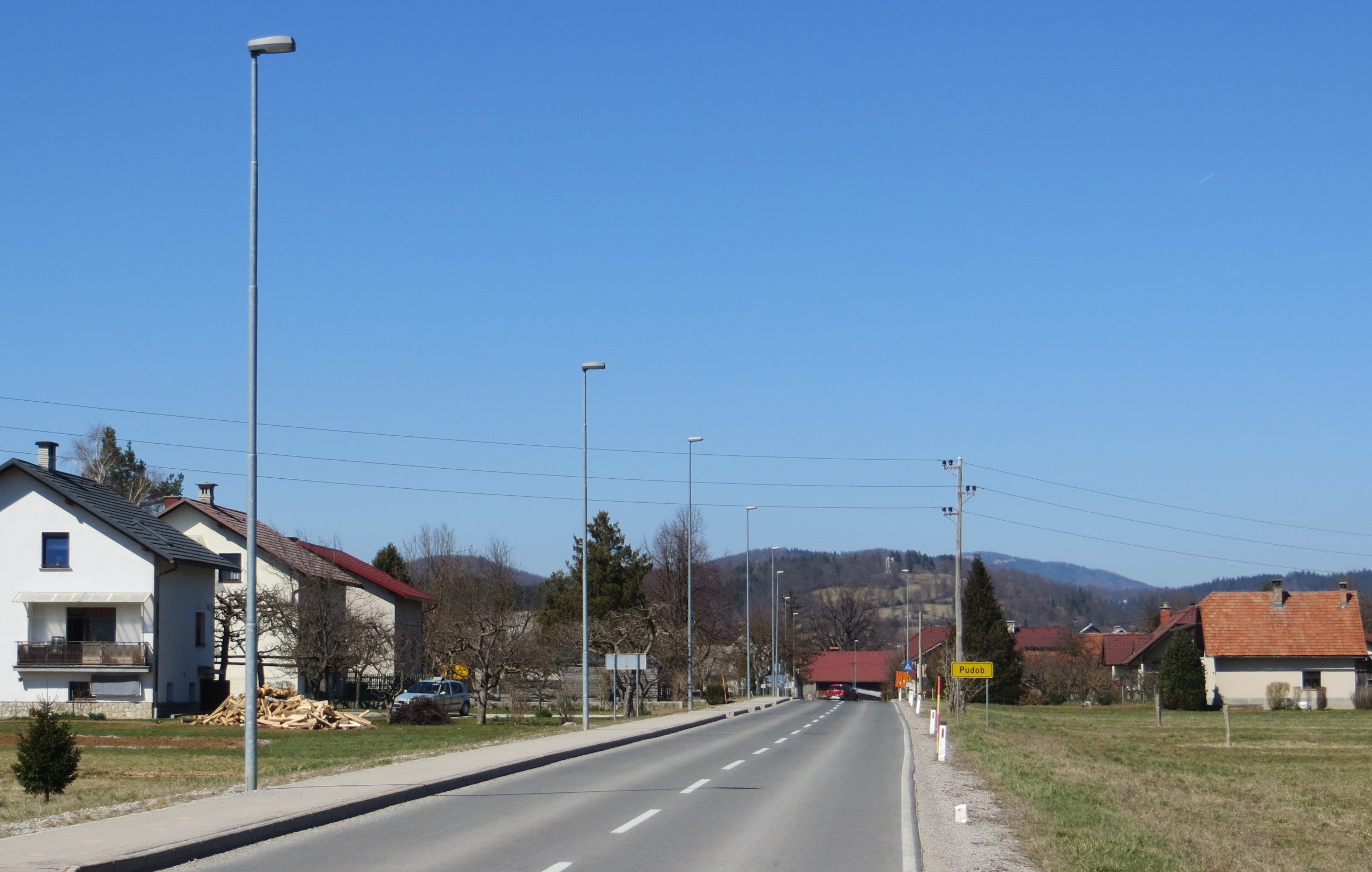

- Location in Slovenia
- Coordinates: 45°41′51.56″N 14°28′44.49″E
- Country: Slovenia
- Traditional region: Inner Carniola
- Statistical region: Littoral–Inner Carniola
- Municipality: Loška Dolina

Area
  - Total: 1.2 km^{2} (0.46 sq mi)
- Elevation: 582.1 m (1,910 ft)

Population (2002)
  - Total: 223

Pudob (pronounced [ˈpuːdɔp]) is a village south of Stari Trg pri Ložu in the Municipality of Loška Dolina in the Inner Carniola region of Slovenia.

== Church ==
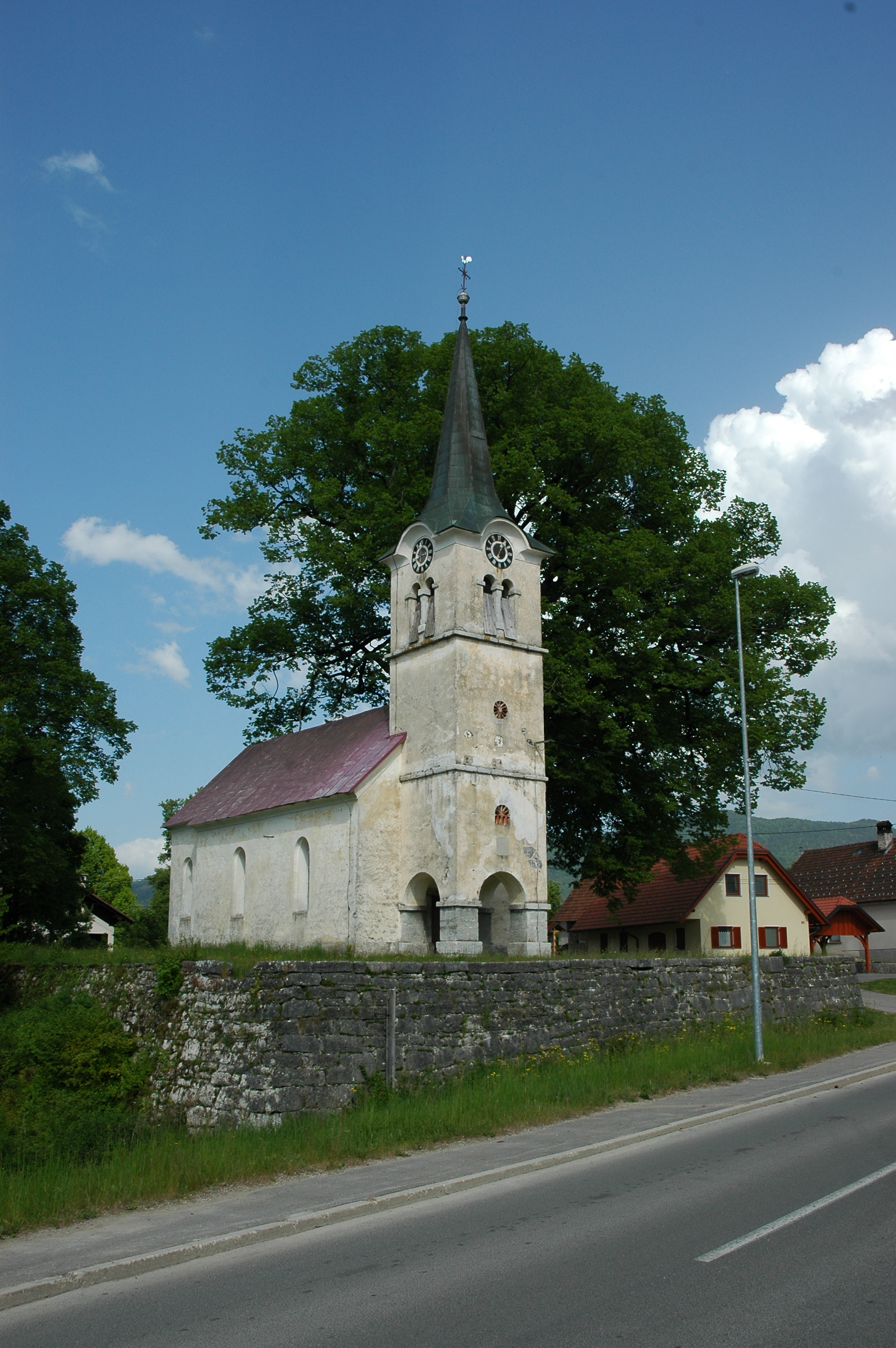
Saint James' Church

The local church in the settlement is dedicated to Saint James and belongs to the Parish of Stari Trg. It was built in the first half of the 16th century.
