= Stari Trg pri Ložu =

- Village
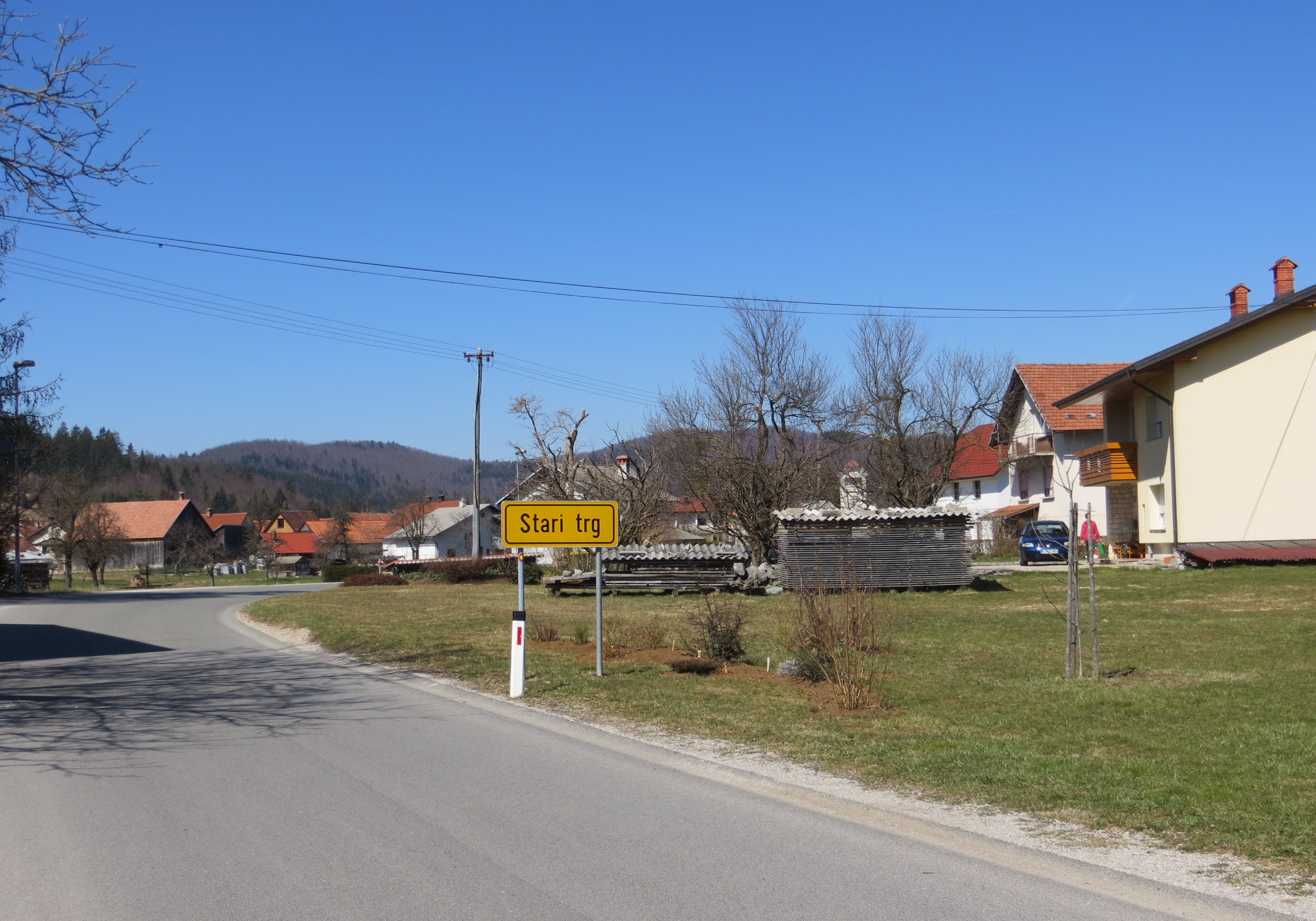

- Location in Slovenia
- Coordinates: 45°42′50.97″N 14°28′10.32″E
- Country: Slovenia
- Traditional region: Inner Carniola
- Statistical region: Littoral–Inner Carniola
- Municipality: Loška Dolina

Area
  - Total: 2.48 km^{2} (0.96 sq mi)
- Elevation: 591.8 m (1,942 ft)

Population (2002)
  - Total: 838

Stari Trg pri Ložu (pronounced [ˈstaːɾi ˈtəɾk pɾi ˈloːʒu]; Slovene: Stari trg pri Ložu, German: Altenmarkt, Italian: Borgovecchio d'Olisa) is a settlement and the administrative seat of the Municipality of Loška Dolina in the Inner Carniola region of Slovenia.

== Geography ==
The territory of Stari Trg pri Ložu includes the former hamlet of Breg (German: Hofrann) on the right bank of Obrh Creek, which was also considered part of the neighboring village of Pudob in the past. The site of the former hamlet is the Marof industrial area today, operated by the company MBS List Lesna Industrija Stari Trg.

== Church ==
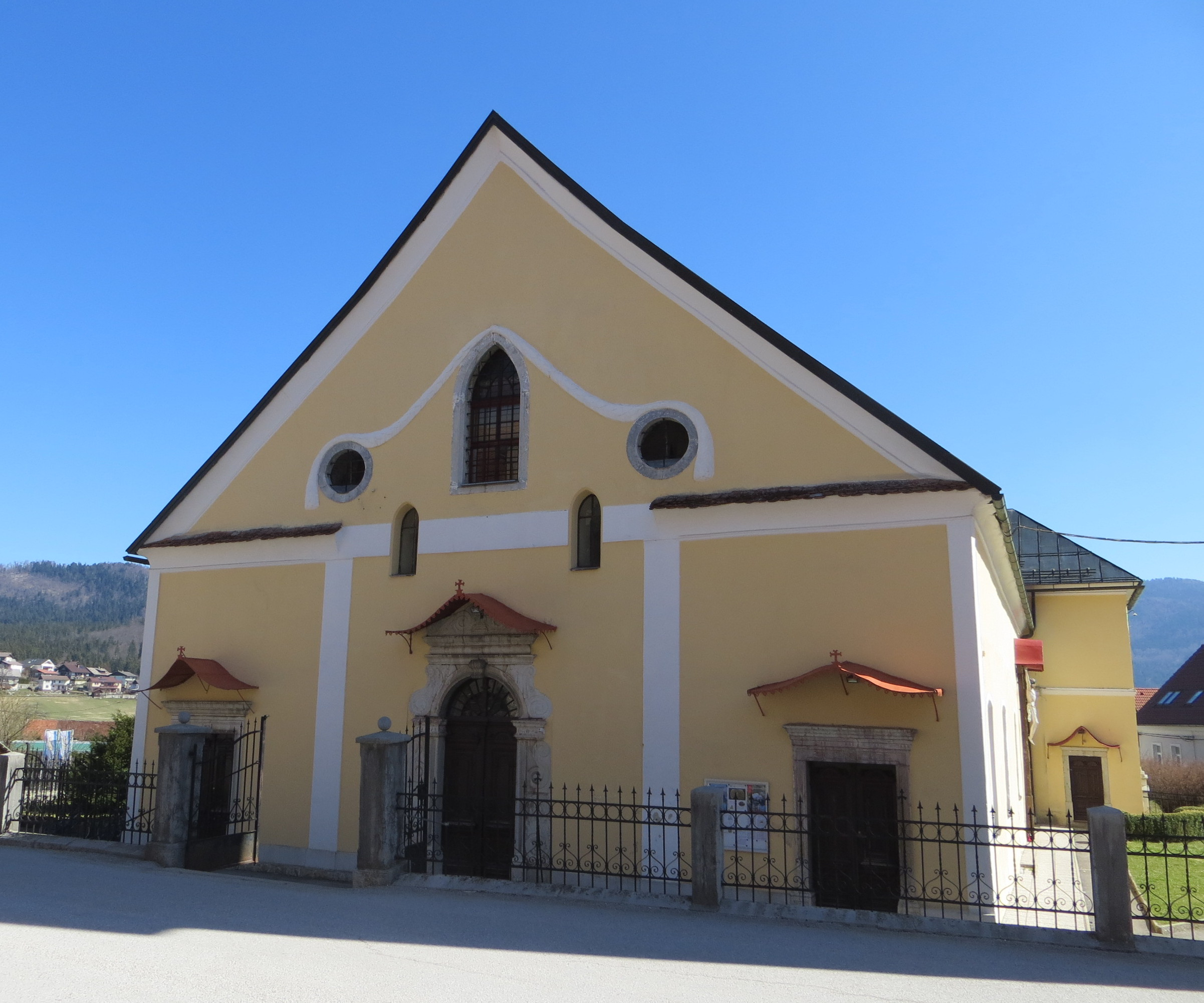
Saint George's Church

The parish church in the settlement is dedicated to Saint George and belongs to the Ljubljana Archdiocese. The parish was created in the second half of the 12th century, and the church was first mentioned in written documents dating to 1221. The original church was rebuilt and expanded on a number of occasions. Frescos from the early 16th century are preserved in the current building and the existing sanctuary was added in 1643.
