= Lož Castle =

Castle ruin in central Slovenia

Coordinates: 45°43′28″N 14°28′19″E

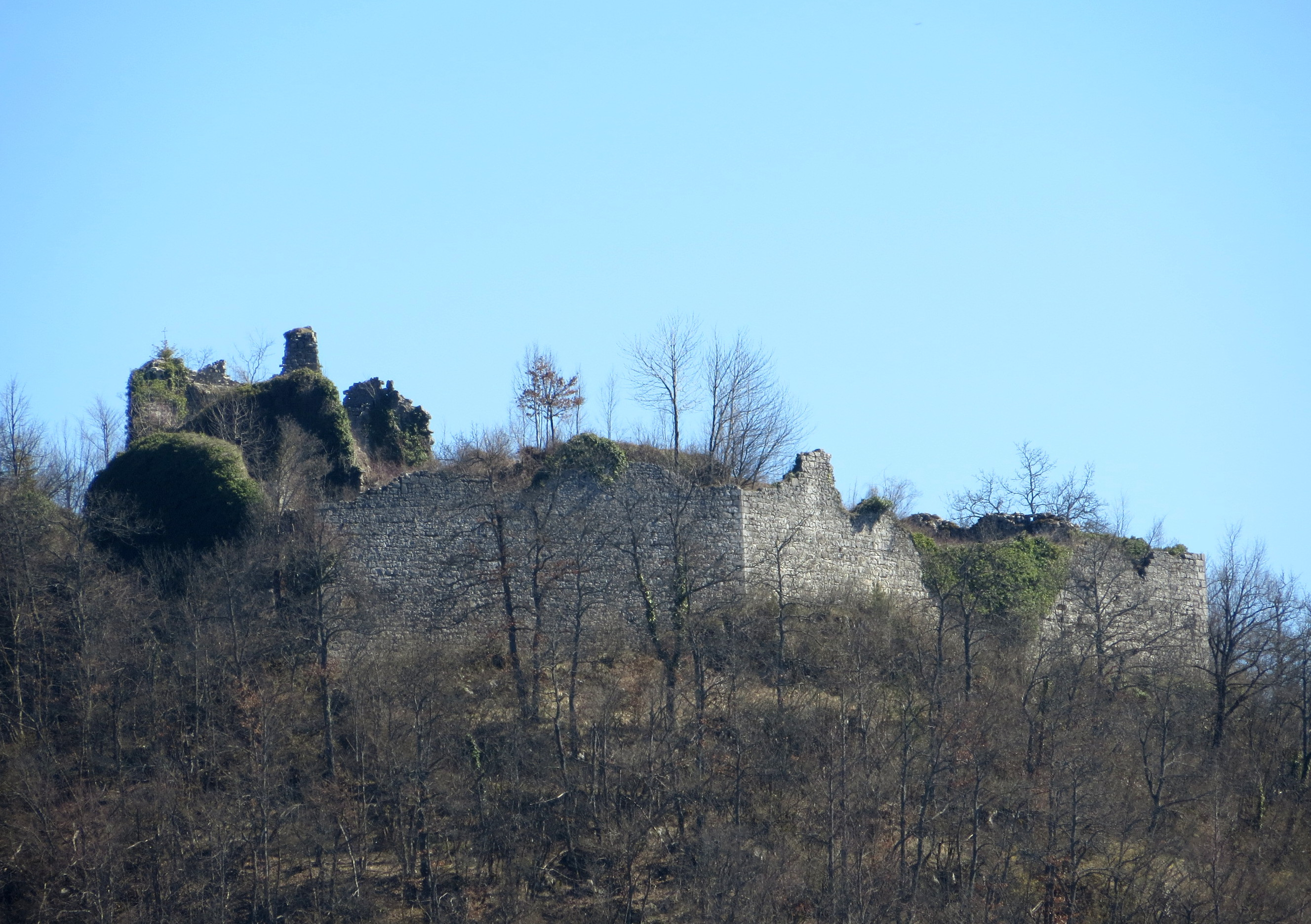
Ruins of Lož Castle

Lož Castle (Slovene: Grad Lož, German: Schloss Laas), also known as Pusti Grad ("Waste Castle"), is a castle ruin above the settlement of Lož in central Slovenia's Lož Valley. The castle and its lordship are mentioned in period documents under various names, including Los, Louse, Lose, and Lösch.

== History ==
Built in the mid-12th century by the Patriarchate of Aquileia, it was first held in fief by the Counts of Vovbrk. Its next inhabitants were the Vovbrk's relatives, the Counts Sternberg from Strmec na Koroškem. In 1244, the Patriarchate succeeded in regaining Lož and all its lands after the Vovbrk's were wiped out in a financial crisis. In 1269 a "gastald" or administrator was first mentioned; his functions would have been economic-administrative, supervisory and judicial, being in particular responsible for the proper collection of duties and taxes. Soon after 1296 the estate became the seat of governors.

Between 1306 and 1308, Lož was unlawfully occupied by count Henry of Gorizia. Afterward, the Patriarchate gave the fief to Carniolan provincial governor Count Meinhard of Ortenburg. In 1342, the Patriarchate gave the castle with all attendant rights and its provincial judiciary in fief to Herman and George Werdenstain, who the same year sold it all to the house of Ortenburg. After the assassination of the Patriarch Bertram of St. Genesius in 1350, the lordship passed to the Habsburgs until 1366.

In that year the Patriarch of Aquileia gave Lož to its ally, Henry, but the latter in 1368 gave John Šteberškemu, who became an ally of the Patriarch Markvarda. The Patriarch has granted Ortenburg Count Friedrich Ortnek castles in fief, Poljane, bones and Čušperk, Loka Castle, among the gifts of this hotel is not included. However, they have well over Grafschaft Ortenburg Ložem owned almost full power even when it is possessed family von der Dürr (1390–1410).

After 1418 the castle and lordship passed by inheritance to the Counts of Celje, who retained it until the line's 1456 extinction. In an earlier war between the Ciili and the Habsburgs, the latter had twice attacked the town of Lož, taking it the second time, but did not breach the castle. The resumption of Habsburg in 1456 saw the castle retained by Ciili lessee Martin Snitzenpawmer. In 1460, he was briefly replaced as tenant by Herman Ravbar, who was in 1461 bought out by Trieste bishop Antonio de Goppo. The following tenants of the estate were the noble families of Haller and Coraduzzi.

In the second half of the 16th and early 17th centuries, Lož Castle and lordship were held by (from 1574) Charles George the noble Hoffer, Erasmus Börse, Franc Šajer, and the brothers Christopher and Francis Moškon. The castle's last tenant was Wolf Paradeiser. In 1635 the castle and estate were bought by Prince Janez Anton Eggenberg, who transferred the seat of the Lož lordship to the more congenial Snežnik Castle, while Lož Castle was abandoned. Its decay accelerated after the lordships of Lož, Snežnik and Postojna were bought by Count Janez Vajkard Turjak (Auersperg) in 1669.
