= Subterranean river =

River that runs wholly or partly beneath the ground surface

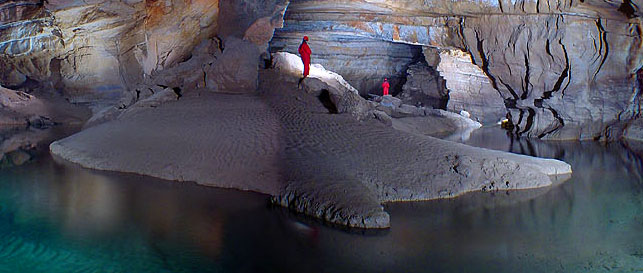
A subterranean river in the Cross Cave system of Slovenia. (Scale shown by people in photograph.)

A subterranean river (also known as an underground river) is a river or watercourse that runs wholly or partly beneath the ground, one where the riverbed does not represent the surface of the Earth. It is distinct from an aquifer, which may flow like a river but is contained within a permeable layer of rock or other unconsolidated materials. A river flowing below ground level in an open gorge is not classed as subterranean.

Some natural rivers may be entirely subterranean, collecting in and flowing through cave systems. In karst topography, rivers that originate above ground can disappear into sinkholes, continuing underground until they reappear on the surface downstream, possibly having merged with other subterranean rivers. The longest subterranean river in the world is the Sistema Sac Actun cave system in Mexico.

Subterranean rivers can also be the result of covering over a river or diverting its flow into culverts, usually as part of urban development. Reversing this process is known as "daylighting" a watercourse and is a major form of visible river restoration. Successful examples include the Cheonggyecheon in the centre of Seoul.

Some fish (colloquially known as cavefish) and other troglobite organisms are adapted to life in subterranean rivers and lakes.

Examples of subterranean rivers also occur in mythology and literature.

== Natural examples ==
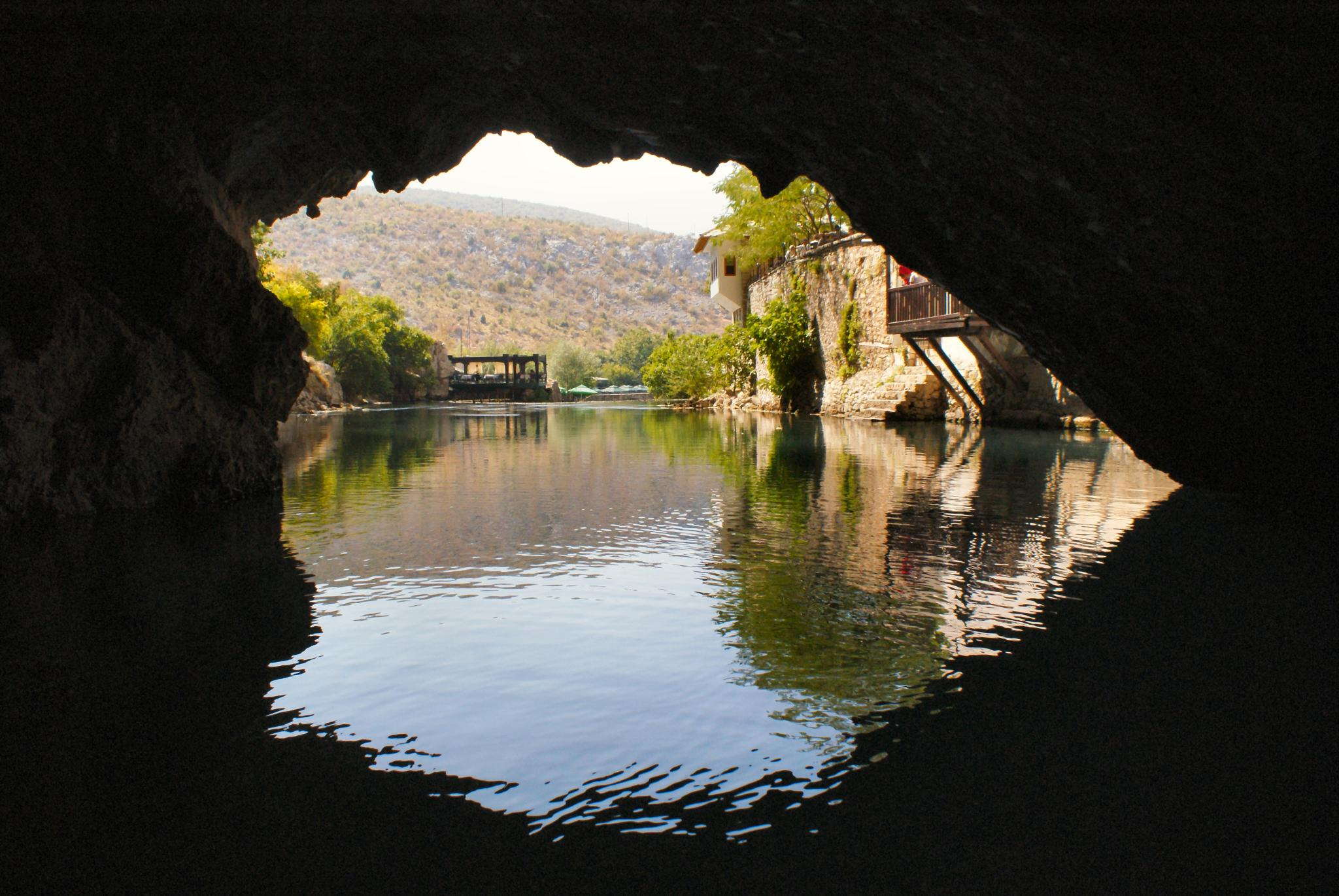
The cave of source of the Buna can be entered by boat and dived through a cave system serving as an effluence of the Zalomka.

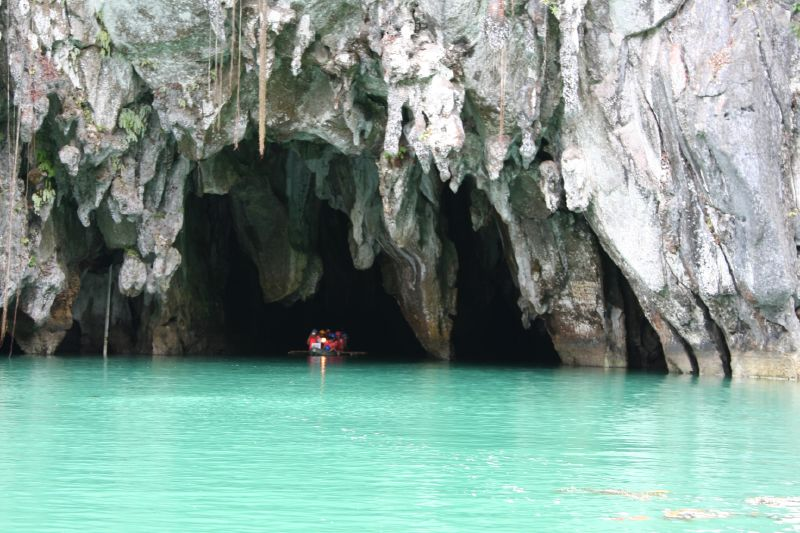
The Puerto Princesa cave can be entered by boat.

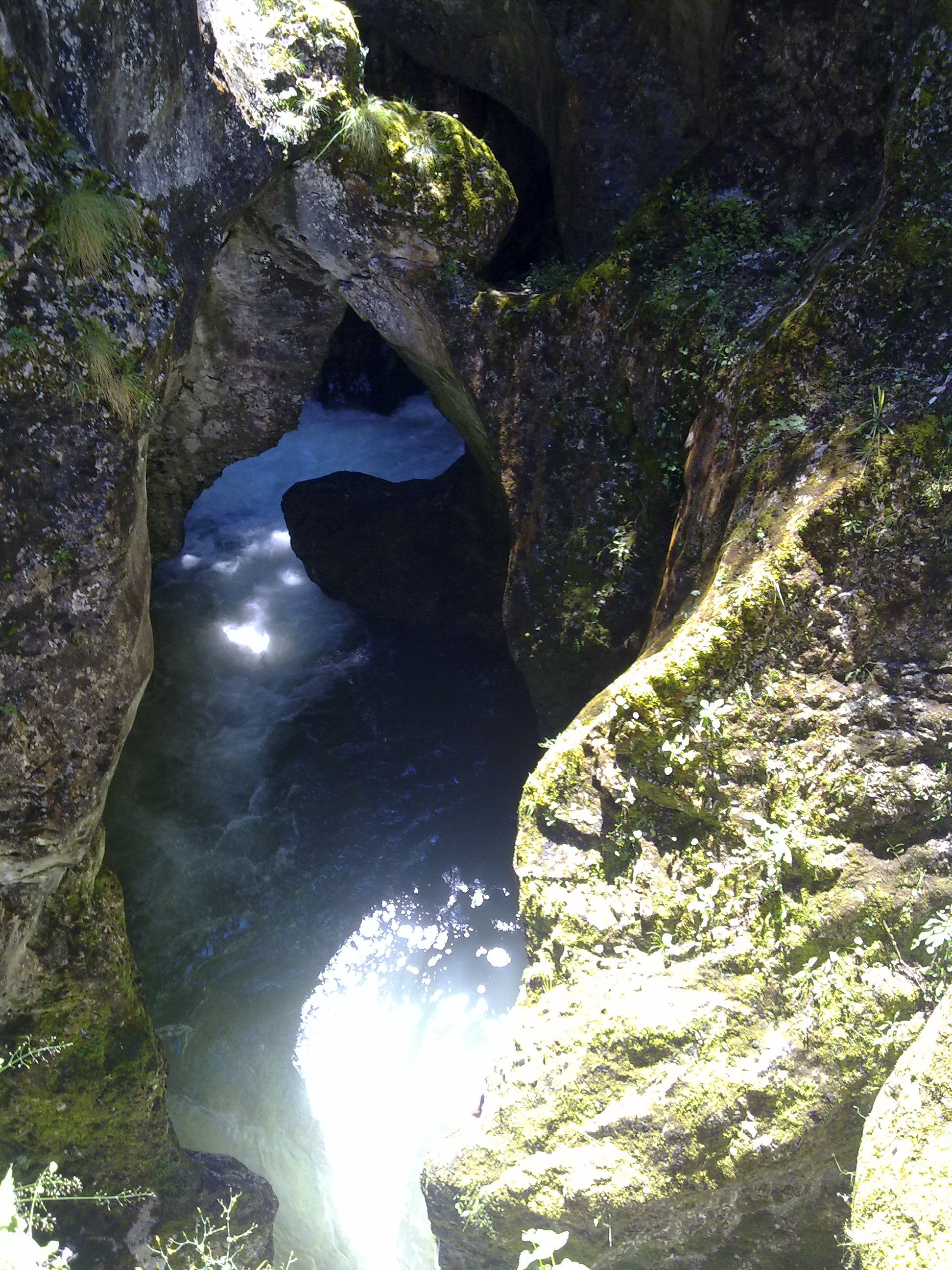
Devil's Throat Cave subterranean river from above

There are many natural examples of subterranean rivers. Among them:

- In Bosnia and Herzegovina: Unac; Mušnica-Trebišnjica-Krupa/Ombla (Ombla springs out of huge cave near Dubrovnik, Croatia and after just ca. 30 meters empties into Adriatic Sea's ria called Rijeka Dubrovačka); Zalomka-Buna/Bunica/Bregava; Vrljika-Trebižat; Lištica-Jasenica; Šuica-Ričina
- In Bulgaria:
  - Banderishka reka, subterranean section below Kutelo Peak, Pirin Mountain
  - Struma River subterranean currents in Duhlata cave, Vitosha Mountain
  - Negovanka River subterranean currents in Emen cave, Veliko Tarnovo Province
  - Trigradska reka, subterranean section where Devil's Throat Cave and Trigrad Gorge, Rhodope Mountains
- The Camuy River located in the northwestern region of Puerto Rico is one of the largest underground river systems in the world.
- The Cross Cave system in Loška Dolina, Slovenia includes 22 subterranean lakes
- The Lost River in the Appalachian Mountains of West Virginia disappears underground and reappears as the Cacapon River
- The Mojave River in southern California flows underground in most places
- The Phong Nha-Kẻ Bàng National Park in Vietnam has an underground river flowing through its cave system
- The Puerto Princesa Subterranean River on the island of Palawan, Philippines flows underground before emerging into the South China Sea
- The Punkva in Moravian Karst, Moravia, Czech Republic underground river flowing through cave system - Punkva Caves and Macocha gorge.
- The Santa Fe River in northern Florida drops into a large sinkhole in O'Leno State Park and reappears in the adjacent River Rise Preserve State Park, 3 miles (4.8 km) downstream.
- The Reka in Slovenia, which disappears in the Škocjan Caves, re-emerges as part of the Timavo in Italy.

== Artificial examples ==
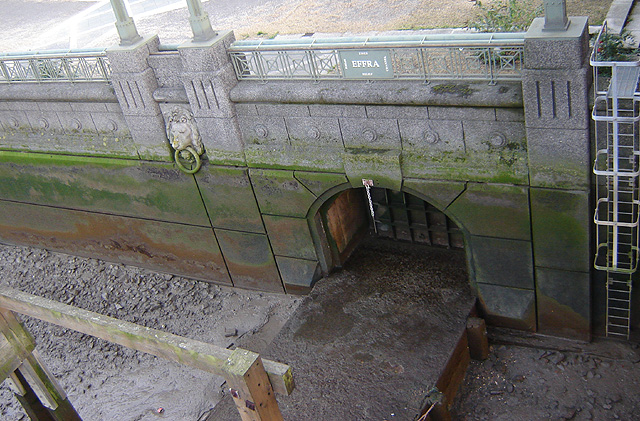
The Effra is one of the subterranean rivers of London. It empties into the Thames by Vauxhall Bridge, from which this photograph was taken.

In many cities there are natural streams which have been partially or entirely built over. Such man-made examples of subterranean urban streams are too numerous to list, but notable examples include:

- The Bièvre underneath Paris, France
- The Boyanska reka (Boyana river), partially underneath Sofia, Bulgaria
- Castle Frank Brook, Garrison Creek, Russell Creek, and Taddle Creek, and other subterranean urban streams in Toronto
- The River Farset, which Belfast is named after, which runs in tunnels underneath the city.
- The Fleet and other subterranean rivers of London
- The Flint River beneath Hapeville, Georgia and Hartsfield–Jackson Atlanta International Airport
- The Frome underneath Bristol
- The Hobart Rivulet in Tasmania
- Mill Creek in Philadelphia
- The Neglinnaya River, which runs through a series of tunnels underneath the central part of Moscow
- The Park River underneath Hartford
- The Spirit Lake Outlet Tunnel underneath Harry's Ridge in Skamania County, Washington, United States
- The River Team underneath the Team Valley Trading Estate, Gateshead, United Kingdom
- The Tank Stream underneath Sydney, Australia
- The Zenne underneath Brussels, following the covering of the Zenne between 1865 and 1871
- Subterranean rivers in Hong Kong
- The Norwich cockeys

== Ecology ==
Some fish (popularly known as cavefish) and other troglobite organisms are adapted to life in subterranean rivers and lakes.

== Mythology and literature ==
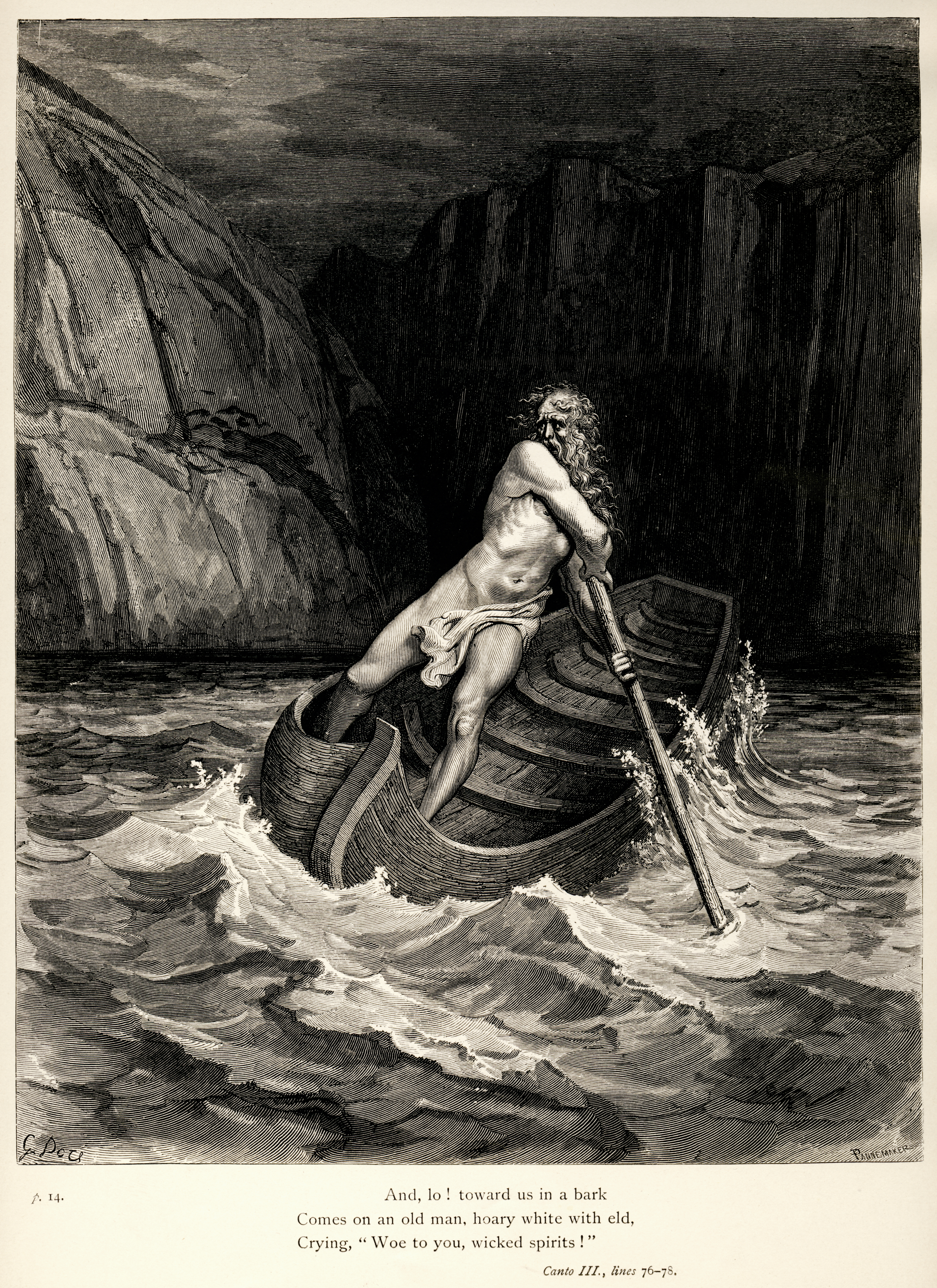
In Dante's Inferno, Charon ferries souls across the subterranean river Acheron.

Greek mythology included the Styx, Phlegethon, Acheron, Cocytus, and Lethe as rivers within the Underworld. Dante Alighieri, in his Inferno, included the Acheron, Phlegethon, and Styx as rivers within his subterranean Hell. Similar references were made in John Milton's Paradise Lost. The river Alph, running "Through caverns measureless to man / Down to a sunless sea" is central to the poem Kubla Khan, by Samuel Taylor Coleridge.

The characters in Jules Verne's Journey to the Center of the Earth encounter a subterranean river:

"Hans was not mistaken," he said. "What you hear is the rushing of a torrent."

"A torrent?" I exclaimed.

"There can be no doubt; a subterranean river is flowing around us."

Several other novels also feature subterranean rivers. The subterranean rivers of London feature in the novel Drowning Man by Michael Robotham as well as in the novel Thrones, Dominations by Dorothy L. Sayers and Jill Paton Walsh in which a character remarks:

"You can bury them deep under, sir; you can bind them in tunnels, but in the end where a river has been, a river will always be."

== See also ==
- Abîme – Vertical shaft in karst
- Black Sea undersea river – Saline water current in the Black Sea
- Karst – Topography from dissolved soluble rocks
- Losing stream – Stream or river that loses water as it flows downstream
- Speleology – Science of cave and karst systems
- Subterranean waterfall – Waterfall located underground
- Underground lake – Lake under the Earth's surface
