= Neuron (disambiguation) =

Neuron is one of the primary cell types in the nervous system.

Neuron may also refer to:

- Artificial neuron, the basic unit in an artificial neural network
- Hartmann Neuron, an electronic musical instrument
- The Dassault nEUROn, a planned stealth unmanned combat air vehicle designed by a consortium of European countries
- Lake Neuron, an underground thermal lake in Albania
- Neuron (journal), a scientific journal publishing scholarly neuroscience articles
- Neuron (software), a simulation environment used in computational neuroscience for modeling individual neurons and networks of neurons
- "Neurons", a song by Avey Tare from his 2023 album 7s
