= Lake Neuron =

Underground thermal lake in southeastern Albania

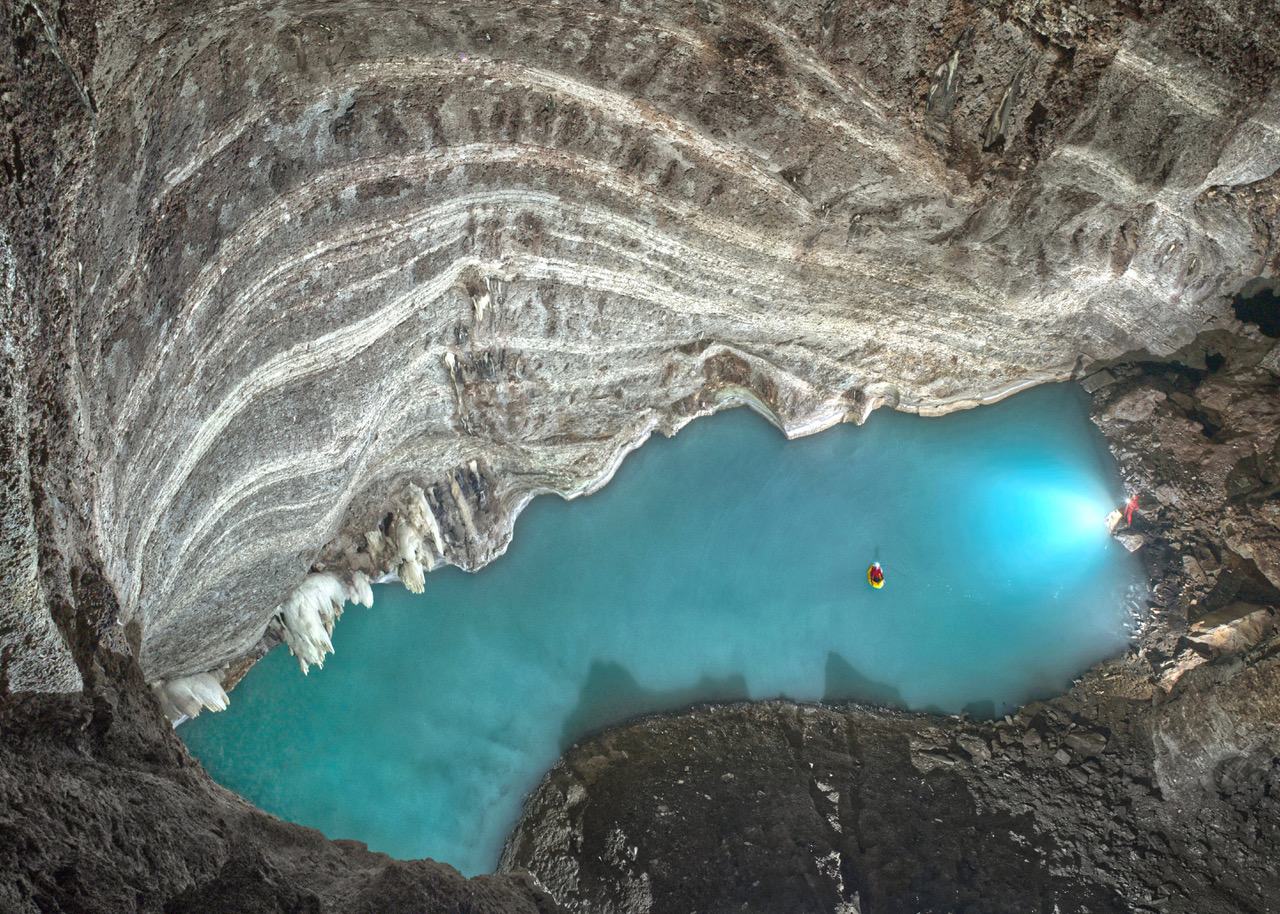
- Interactive map of Lake Neuron
- Location: Albania
- Type: Lake
- Max. length: 138 m (453 ft)
- Max. width: 42 m (138 ft)

Lake Neuron (Albanian: Liqeni i Neuronit) is an underground thermal lake near Leskovik in Albania. Discovered by scientists in 2025, it is the world's largest known underground thermal lake, located 127 metres (417 ft) underground.

== Discovery ==
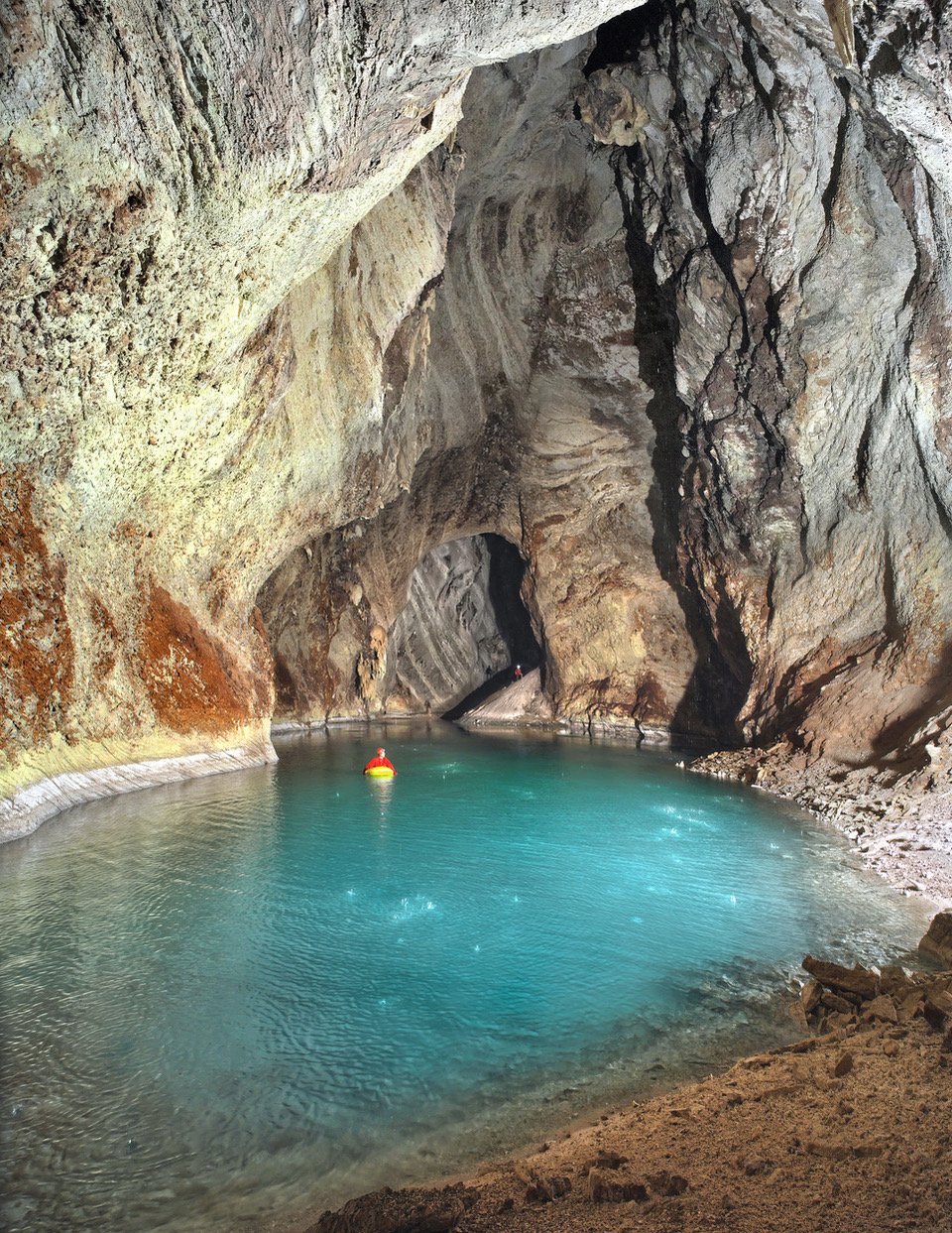
A view from the north

In February 2025, it was reported that a team of Czech scientists discovered what is now considered the world's largest underground thermal lake. It was named "Lake Neuron" after The Neuron Foundation, a Czech organization supporting scientific research which funded the expedition. The team, led by Czech speleologist Marek Audy, used the latest scanning technology, including the GeoSlam system, a 3D scanning method used to generate precise models of cave formations. Audy stated that he has always been drawn to underexplored regions, with Albania being one of them. Initially visiting as a kayaker, he noticed features in the landscape resembling areas with thermal caves, which inspired further exploration and ultimately led to the discovery.

Czech researchers had been exploring underground formations in mountain valleys along the Albania-Greece border for several years. In 2021, during an expedition in the Vromoneri Valley near Leskovik, Albania, they identified a large cave system with multiple thermal springs. While tracing these thermal sources, they discovered a 100-meter-deep abyss, named "Atmos". Scientists confirmed the largest known thermal lake at the bottom of the abyss.

The discovery was expected to contribute to hydrological and geological research in the region.

== Description ==
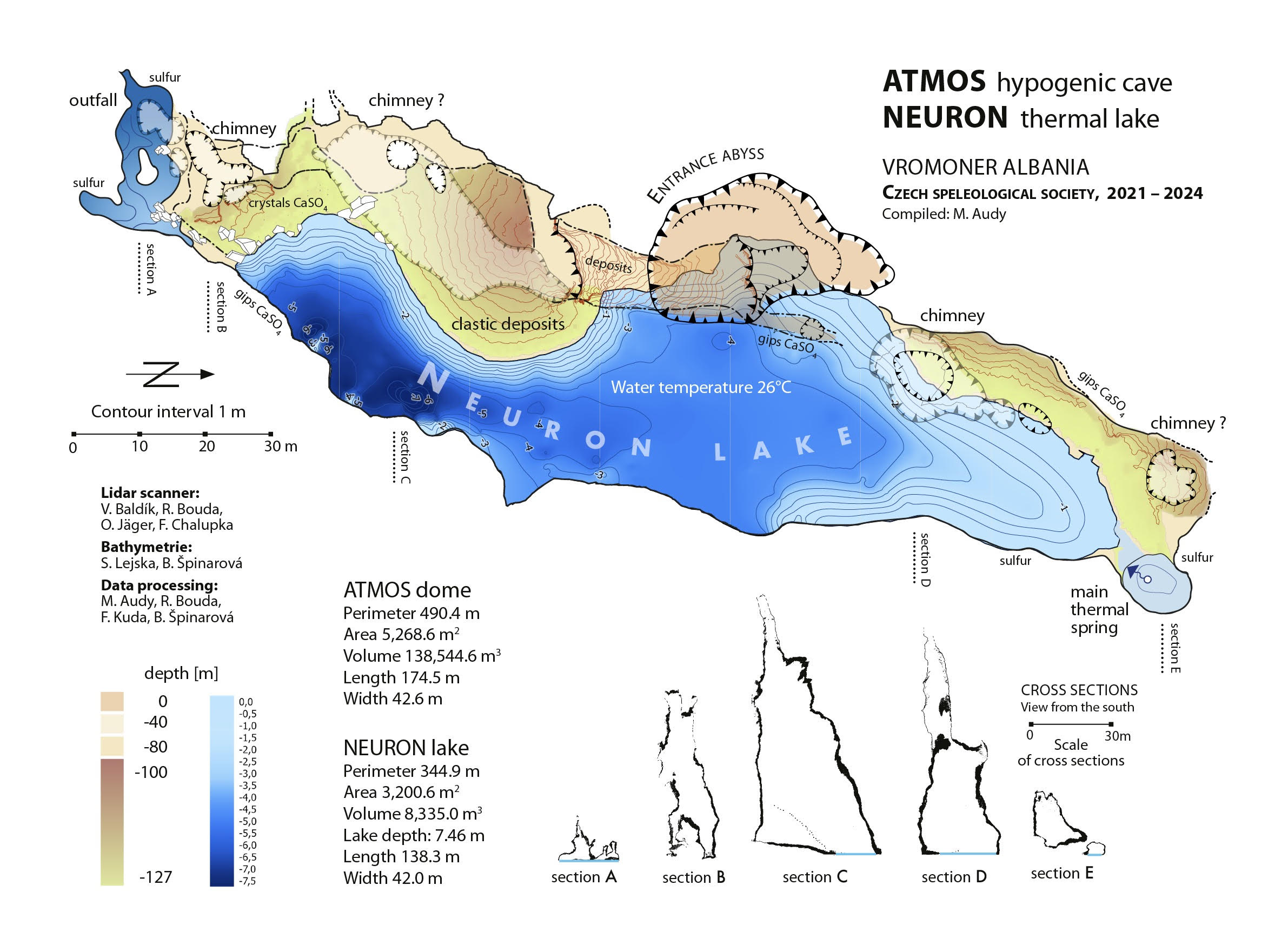
Map of Lake Neuron

Lake Neuron is the largest known underground thermal lake. Located 127 metres (417 ft) underground, it measures 138 metres (453 ft) in length, 42 metres (138 ft) in width, has a perimeter of 345 metres (1,132 ft), and contains approximately 8,335 cubic metres (294,300 cu ft) of thermal water.

The cave’s formation is unusual, as the lake’s mineral-rich water contains hydrogen sulfide, which oxidizes upon contact with air, producing sulfuric acid that continuously transforms limestone into soft gypsum.

== See also ==
- Cross Cave
- Lake Hévíz
- Saint-Léonard underground lake
