= Sapropel =

Dark-coloured sediments rich in organic matter

Sapropel (a contraction of Ancient Greek words sapros and pelos, meaning putrefaction and mud (or clay), respectively) is a term used in marine geology to describe dark-coloured sediments that are rich in organic matter. Organic carbon concentrations in sapropels commonly exceed 2 wt.% in weight.

The term sapropel events may also refer to cyclic oceanic anoxic events (OAE), in particular those affecting the Mediterranean Sea with a periodicity of about 21,000 years.

== Formation ==
Sapropels have been recorded in the Mediterranean sediments since the closure of the Eastern Tethys Ocean 13.5 million years ago. The formation of sapropel events in the Mediterranean Sea occurs approximately every 21,000 years and last between 3,000 and 5,000 years. The first identification of these events occurred in the mid-20th century. Since then, their formulative conditions have been investigated.

The occurrence of sapropels has been related to the Earth's orbital parameters (Milankovitch cycles). The precession cycles influence the African monsoon, which influences the Mediterranean circulation through increases in freshwater inputs.

Sapropels develop during episodes of reduced oxygen availability in bottom waters, such as an oceanic anoxic event (OAE). Most studies of formational mechanisms infer some degree of reduced deep-water circulation. Oxygen can only reach the deep sea by new deep-water formation and consequent "ventilation" of deep basins. There are two main causes of OAE: reduction in deep-water circulation or raised oxygen demand from upper level.

A reduction in deep-water circulation will eventually lead to a serious decrease in deep-water oxygen concentrations due to biochemical oxygen demand associated with the decay of organic matter. This sinks into the deep sea as a result of export production from surface waters. Oxygen depletion in bottom waters then favors the enhanced preservation of the organic matter during burial by the sediments. Organic-rich sediments may also form in well-ventilated settings that have highly productive surface waters; here the high surface demand simply extracts the oxygen before it can enter the deep circulation current thus depriving the bottom waters of oxygen.

== Significance ==
Sapropelic deposits from global ocean anoxic events form important oil source rocks. Detailed process studies of sapropel formation have concentrated on the fairly recent eastern Mediterranean deposits, the last of which occurred between 9.5 and 5.5 thousand years ago.

The Mediterranean sapropels of the Pleistocene reflect increased density stratification in the isolated Mediterranean basin. They record a higher organic carbon concentration than non-sapropel times; an increase in the δ^{15}N and corresponding decrease in δ^{13}C tells of rising productivity as a result of nitrogen fixation. This effect is more pronounced further east in the basin, suggesting that increased precipitation was most pronounced at that end of the sea.

== In the Black Sea ==
In the Black Sea, sapropels are distributed at a depth of 500 to 2200 m, and in different morpholithological zones they have different thicknesses. Deep sea sediments are called the sediments formed outside the zone of influence of hydrogenic factors such as wind-driven waves and internal waves as well as of the transgressive and regressive cycles of the Black Sea basin. Here, under the conditions of relative stagnation, can be observed uninterrupted cross-sections because this area was under the sea level during the entire Pleistocene and Holocene. Deep sea organogenic mineral sediments (DSOMS) are those sediments that contain more than 3% organic carbon. The sapropels form a single horizon with constant thickness typical of the Black Sea basin. Analogues of the sapropels on the continental shelf and the upper part of the continental slope are the green aleurite-pelite, oozes with accumulation of plant detritus and decomposed shells of Mytilus galloprovincialis. The transition from aleurite-pelitic oozes to sapropels is facial. The organic matter in the sapropels is of heterogeneous origin. They are composed primarily of planktogenic organisms (about 80%) and continental organic matter (20%). The planktonic organisms are well preserved in most cases under the conditions of the hydrogen sulfide zone. The main components of the sapropels are the dinoflagellate cysts, diatom algae, coccolithophorids, peridiniales. The mineral part of sapropel muds is represented by a poly-component mixture of clay minerals. The minerals illite and montmorillonite predominate, chlorite and kaolinite occur in subordinate quantities. Individual grains of quartz, feldspar, volcanic glass and others are rarely found among them. Carbonate minerals are mainly represented by calcite and dolomite. It is generally accepted that the main source of hydrogen sulfide in the Black Sea today are the processes of anaerobic decomposition of organic matter by sulfate-reducing bacteria (SRB). The organic substance that is fixed at the bottom of the basin in the form of organogenic-mineral sediments (sapropels) is a product of the mass extinction of the plankton biomass as a result of the Black Sea flood. There is an excess of a huge amount of organic matter, which creates favorable conditions for the development of bacterial sulfate reduction.

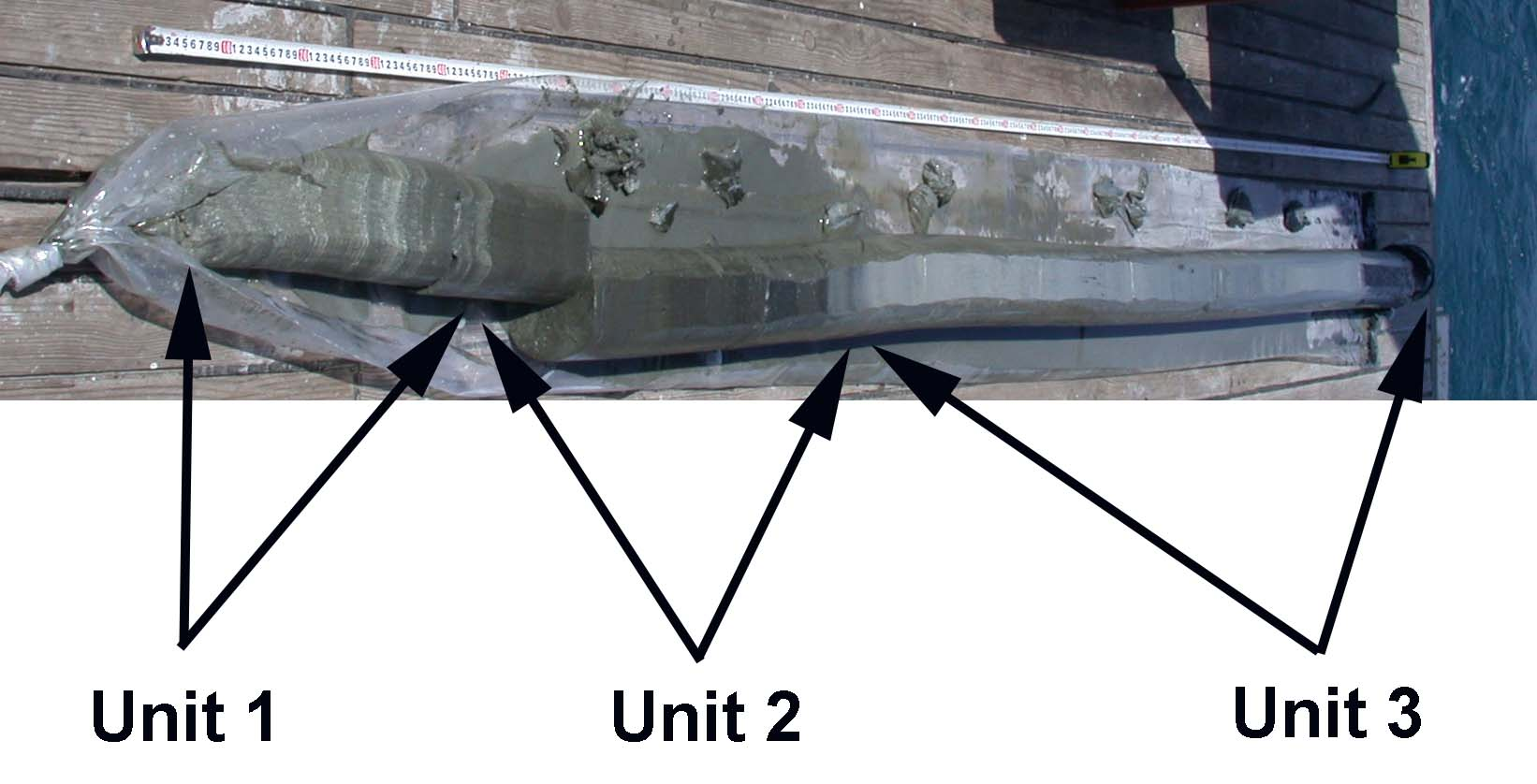
Contrast lithologic borders between coccolitic mud (Unit 1), sapropel mud (Unit 2), seekreide (lutite) (Unit 3), geological research along the route of South Stream pipeline with R/V Akademik (June, 2009) in the Bulgarian Exclusive Economic Zone in the Black Sea, depth 1500 m.

== Non-conventional source of energy ==
Bulgarian Professor Petko Dimitrov is the creator of the idea for the application of sapropel sediments from the bottom of the Black Sea as a natural ecological fertilizer and biological products. According to the Romanian tycoon Dinu Patriciu, the sapropel sediments have the potential to be a source of non-conventional energy. Patriciu has created a marine exploration project in the Black Sea which examines the sapropel sediments of that region. Sediment cores are collected and investigated by several universities and research institutes across the world.

== See also ==
- Pelite, mud rocks
