= Petko Dimitrov =

Bulgarian marine geologist and oceanographer

Petko Dimitrov Петко Димитров
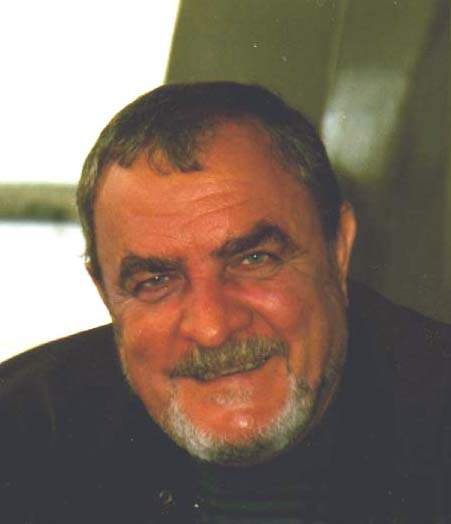
- Born: September 16, 1944
- Died: April 29, 2023
- Education: Sofia University "St. Kliment Ohridski"
- Known for: Black Sea deluge hypothesis

Petko Stoyanov Dimitrov (Bulgarian: Петко Стоянов Димитров) (16 September 1944 – 29 April 2023) was a Bulgarian marine geologist and oceanographer from the Institute of Oceanology - Bulgarian Academy of Sciences in Varna. He has been an early proponent of the Black Sea deluge hypothesis which gained public notoriety at the end of the XXc.

== Biography ==
Born on September 16, 1944, in the village of Novachene, Sofia Province. In 1969 he graduated from Sofia University "St. Kliment Ohridski", Faculty of Geology and Geography, specialty geology-geochemistry. From 1969 to 1975 he worked in the uranium mine "Eleshnitsa" as a deputy director. In 1975 he won a competition for a research associate and was employed at the Institute of Oceanology - BAS. In 1979 he defended his dissertation on "Genesis of marine sediments in the peripheral region of the western part of the Black Sea shelf in the Quaternary" under the guidance of Academician Yastrebov and Prof. Aksenov at the Shirshov Institute of Oceanology, Moscow.

- He introduced new scientific disciplines for the Bulgaria - "Marine Geology" and "Geoarchaeology".
- Scientific Secretary of IO-BAS, Varna, 1977 - 1984; Deputy Director of IO-BAS, Varna, 1984 - 1993; Head of the Department "Marine Geology and Archaeology" of IO-BAS, Varna, 1997 - 2009.
- There is original research related to the "Black Sea deluge hypothesis"
- Leader and participant in over 30 international scientific expeditions in the Black Sea (with Dr. Robert Ballard 2001, 2002; Woods Hole Oceanographic Institution 2006; Prof. William Ryan 2009, 2011 – project 02–337 "Ancient coastlines of the Black Sea and conditions for human presence", funded by the Bulgarian National Science Fund at the Ministry of Education and Science of Bulgaria). His is the most sensational, but also the most controversial find in Bulgarian archeology, the so-called "Noah's Plate". It was discovered on July 15, 1985 at a depth of about 93 m and 65 km inland from Varna. There is still no one to acknowledge its authenticity.
- He participated in international scientific expeditions to the Pacific Ocean (1982), the Atlantic Ocean and the Mediterranean Sea (1984).
- The first Bulgarian scientist studied Manganese nodule in Pacific Ocean.
- Membership in scientific organizations: Member of Union of Scientists - Varna, Bulgarian Geological Society, Bulgarian Geographical Society, Foreign member of the National Academy of Sciences of Ukraine.
- Honorary citizen of the city of Varna, 2013
- Research interests: Black Sea, Geology, Geochemistry, Marine geology, Black Sea deluge hypothesis, alternative sources and energy resources from the bottom of the Black Sea, Maritime history, archeology and geoarcheology, uranium minerals and uranium mining.
- Teaching activity: Lecturer in Marine Geology, Lithology and Geochemistry in Nikola Vaptsarov Naval Academy and Varna Free University. Lecturer at the University of Bologna and the University Consortium in Underwater Archeology - Sicily, Italy.
- Scientific publications: Author and co-author of over 150 scientific articles and books. Citations: over 1300.
- He is the creator of the idea for the application of sapropel sediments from the bottom of the Black Sea as a natural ecological fertilizer and biological products. Patent BG No. 63868, Register No. 104106.
- Scientific awards: Medal for scientific contributions "St. St. Cyril and Methodius"- II degree, for realization of the project "Correlation of Geological, Climatic and Historical Events in the Black Sea, Marmara Sea and Mediterranean Sea during the last 25000 years (Noah's Flood Project)".
- Participation in films about the Black Sea Flood (Black Sea deluge hypothesis) – "BBC–Horizon–1996 – Noah's Flood", ZDF "Terra X 56 Die Sintflut", UFOTV "Dark Secrets of Black Sea", "Ancient X-Files: Season 2 Episode 8 - Great Flood and Scottish Stone Mystery - National Geographic" etc.
- Collaborator of the Institute of Ancient Civilizations in Sofia.
- He was a member of the High Attestation Commission (Scientific Commission for Geological and Geographical Sciences) - 2 mandate.
- OUR MEMORY ON LIFE AND SCIENTIFIC ACTIVITY BY PROFESSOR DIMITROV PETKO STOYANOV.

== Monographs and books ==
- Димитров П. 1988. Далеч от брегове и фарватери. Варна. Изд. "Галактика". Библиотека "Нептун", 161 с., doi:10.13140/RG.2.2.19449.36965/1
- Димитров П., Д. Димитров. 2003. Черно море, Потопът и древните митове. "Славена", Варна, ISBN 954-579-278-7, 91 с., doi:10.13140/RG.2.2.27133.05609
  - ((en)) Dimitrov P., D. Dimitrov. 2004. The Black Sea The Flood and the ancient myths. "Slavena", Varna, ISBN 954-579-335-X, 91 p., doi:10.13140/RG.2.2.18954.16327
  - ((ru)) Димитров П., Д. Димитров. 2008. Черное море, Потоп и древние мифы. "Славена", Варна, ISBN 954-579-278-7, 89 с., doi:10.13140/RG.2.2.23148.46729
