= Kow Ata =

Lake in Turkmenistan

- The Bakharlyn
- Köw Ata (Turkmen)
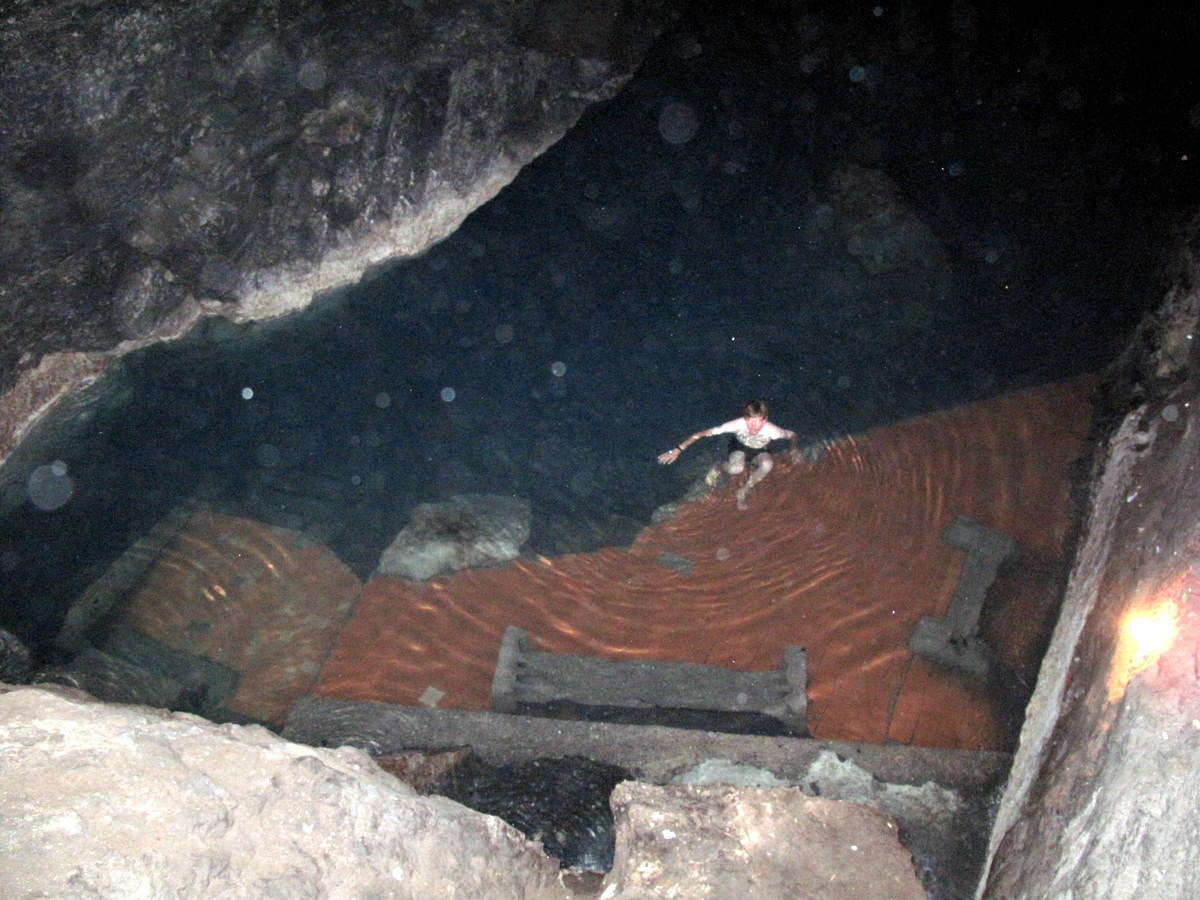
- The lake as seen in 2009

- Location within Turkmenistan
- Interactive map of Kow Ata
- Location: Bäherden, Baherden District, Ahal Province
- Coordinates: 38.2975°N 57.5222°E
- Type: Underground lake
- Basin countries: Turkmenistan
- Max. length: 75–80 m (246–262 ft)
- Max. width: 8–23 m (26–75 ft)
- Average depth: 10 m (33 ft)
- Max. depth: 15 m (49 ft)
- Max. temperature: 38 °C (100 °F)
- Min. temperature: 33 °C (91 °F)

Kow Ata
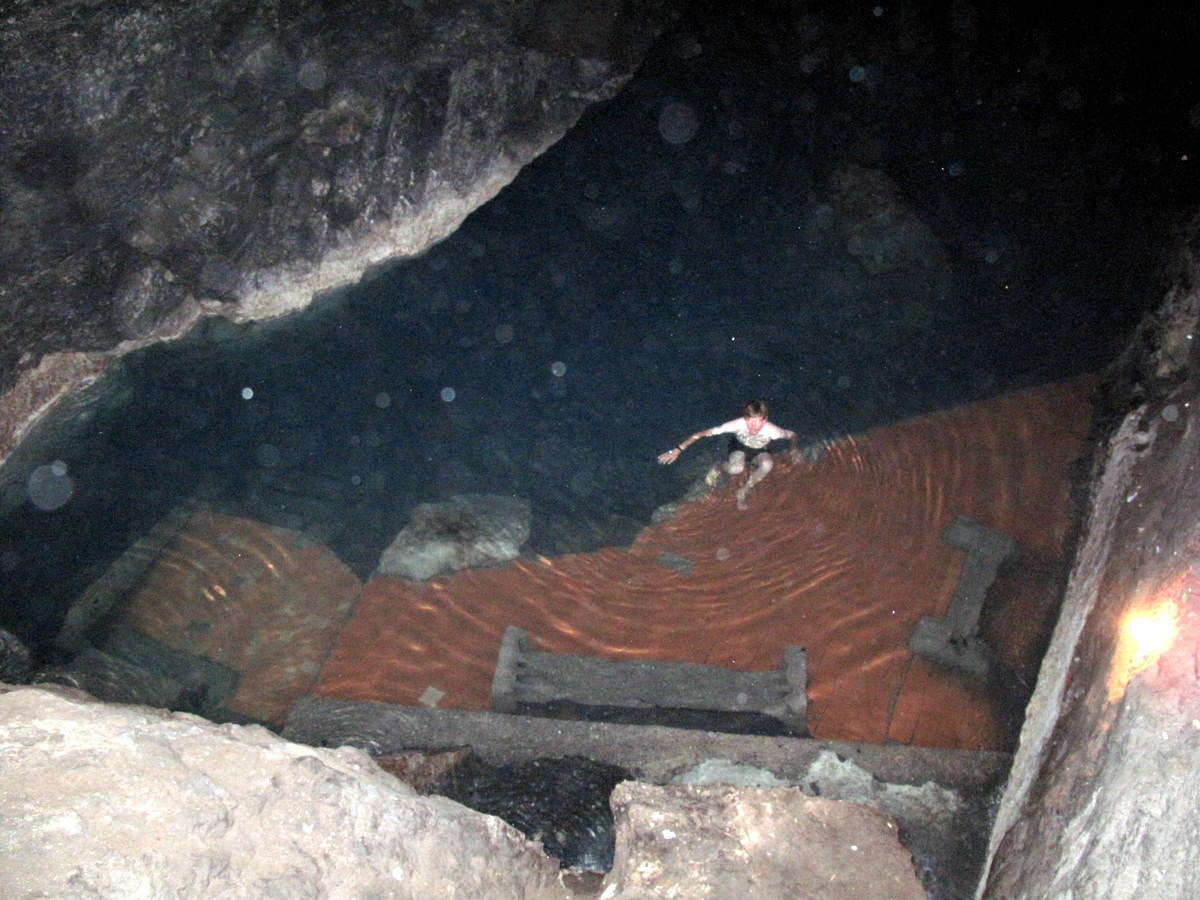
- Interactive map of Kow Ata
- Location: Turkmenistan
- Type: Underground lake
- Max. length: 80 metres (260 ft)
- Average depth: 10 metres (33 ft)

Kow Ata (also The Bakharlyn) is an underground lake in an eponymous cave near Bäherden in Turkmenistan, at the foot of the Kopet Dag. It is the largest in Commonwealth of Independent States.

== History ==
The landform was first documented by archaeologists in 1856. Coverage by the local press in 1896—noting the authorities of Bäherden rail-station to have had a wooden staircase installed for safe descent—led to tourists from Ashgabat flocking the site.

In 1960s, a road was constructed to the cave, electricity supplied, and hotels built in nearby areas.

== Geology ==
=== Cave ===
The cave has a length of 250 m (820 ft) and variable width of 12–50 m (39–164 ft). There are five entrances.

=== Lake ===
The lake is at a depth of 55 m (180 ft) from the 3rd (by height) cave entrance; (Note: Staircases are only installed at this entrance.) no sunlight reaches the cave. Length is reported to lie between 75 m (246 ft) and 80 m (260 ft); breadth varies, across the length, between 8 m (26 ft) and 23 m (75 ft). Average depth is about 10 m (33 ft); maximum depth is 15 m (49 ft).

The water flows out into a sulfur-rich spring.

== Limnology ==
The temperature of the lake remains roughly constant throughout the year, between 33 °C (91 °F) and 38 °C (100 °F). The water has a high mineral content (Note: Turkmenistan Government claims the water to contain 38 elements including sulfur, iodine, magnesium, potassium, sodium, sulfate, aluminum, bromine, iron, and antimony.) and is especially rich in sulfur. The water is transparent with a shade of bluish green.

== Flora and fauna ==
Bats, rodents, birds, and about 50 invertebrate species inhabit the cave.

== Tourism ==
Bathing is permitted in Kow Ata, making it a prominent weekend destination for residents of Ashgabat. A long-winding illuminated staircase leads to the cave. Changing cubicles and an observation platform are provided at about 80% length of the stair-route. There are no safety features except a tape warning swimmers to not proceed beyond.

=== Healing ===
Balneotherapy is practiced.
