= Snežnik Castle =

Medieval Slovenian castle

Coordinates: 45°40′58.22″N 14°28′9.54″E

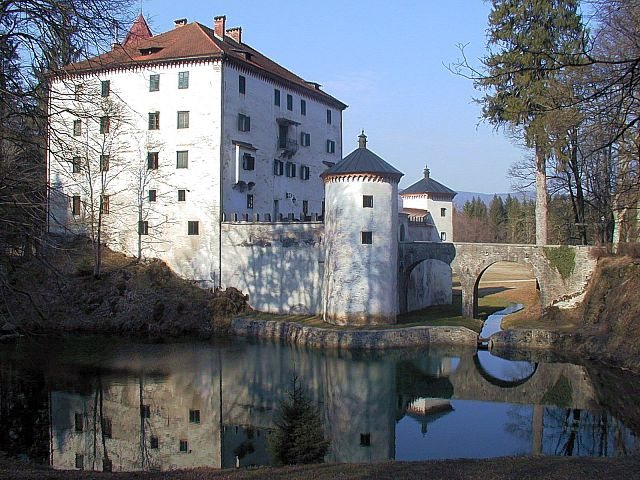
Snežnik Castle

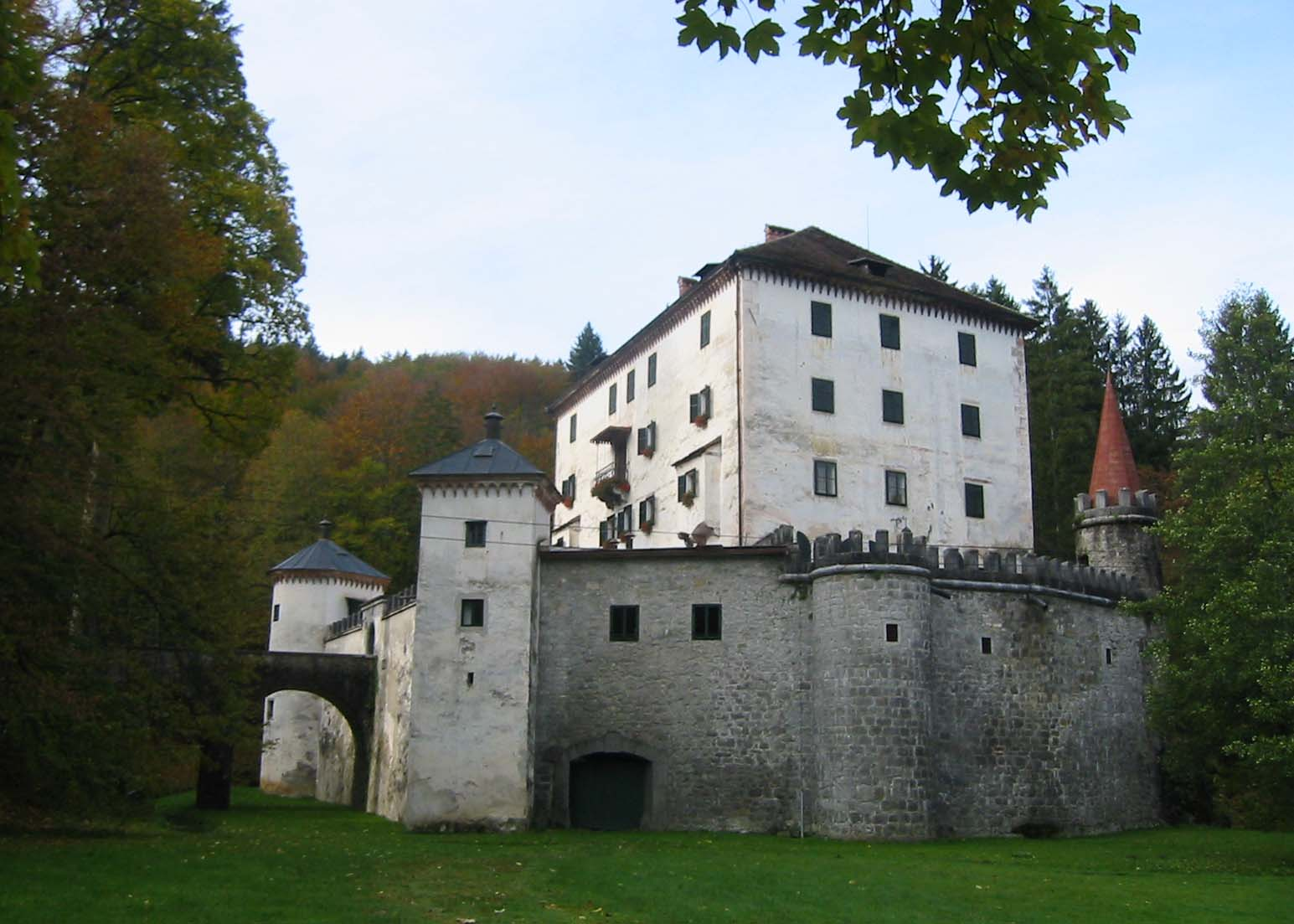
Snežnik Castle

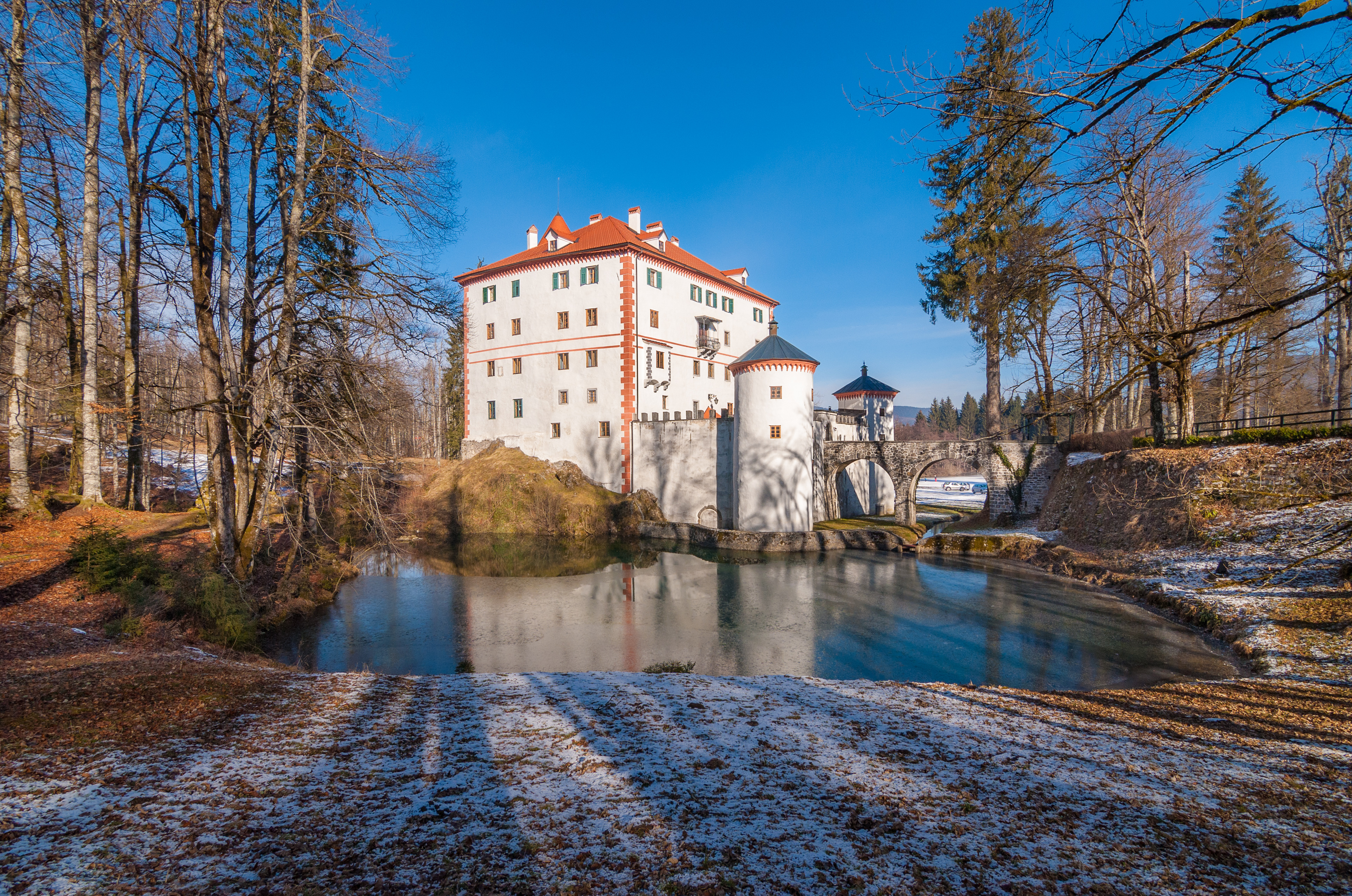
Snežnik Castle after renovation

Snežnik Castle aand its park as seen from a kite

Snežnik Castle (Slovene: Grad Snežnik, German: Schloß Schneeberg) is a 13th-century castle in the municipality of Loška Dolina, Slovenia. It is located in the southwest part of the Lož Valley, near the settlement of Kozarišče.

== Etymology ==
The castle's name is coincidentally identical to a univerbation based on the Slovene word sneg ('snow'), but is actually a Slovenized form of the name of the noble house of Schneberg, whose possession it initially was.

== History ==
The date of the castle's construction is unclear; its existence is first attested in 1269, by way of mention of its owner Meinhard von Schneberg (Slovene: Majnhard Snežniški, Latin: Meynardus de Sneperch); at the time it was a possession of the Patriarchate of Aquileia, with the Schnebergs as their ministeriales. The family fractured the estate through multiple heirs; by the late 14th century the castle had several co-owners. In 1393, a quarter-share of it and several neighboring farms was purchased by William II von Lamberg, a relative of the Schnebergs; his descendants increased their share through the 15th century until they owned the entire estate, giving the castle its more-or-less current renaissance appearance as well.

The Lambergs were followed by the houses of Eggenberg, Lichtenberg, and Schönburg-Waldenburg. By marriages, the castle passed to the Scheyer family, followed by the Pranckhs and, in the first third of the 17th century, the barons Rambschissl, who sold it to the Imperial governor of Carniola, prince Eggenberg. Along with Snežnik, the prince bought the lordship of Lož, moving its administrative center from the uncomfortable, hilltop Lož Castle to the more amiable and better-accessible manor at Snežnik. In 1669, Janez Žiga Eggenberg sold the Loš-Snežnik lordship to prince Janez Vajkard Auersperg, the count of Gottschee (Kočevje).

in 1707 the estate was taken over by count Jurij Gotfrid Lichtenberg, who in 1718 permanently joined the Lož and Snežnik lordships. The house of Lichtenberg held the estate for 140 years, a period marked by the centralist policies of the Habsburg monarchy, in particular the constant diminution of the rights of the nobility. By the early 19th century, the Lichtenberg had been forced deep into hock; a court-ordered appraisal occurred in 1816. In 1832 the family was forced to accept a lottery loan; the main prize was the entire Snežnik estate, or 250,000 florins. The lucky winner, a Hungarian blacksmith, took the cash, while the Lichtenbergs went on to sell the estate in 1847 to a Viennese couple named Karis, who went bankrupt shortly thereafter. The estate was purchased at auction in 1853 for 800,000 florins by the German prince Oton Viktor Schoenburg-Waldenburg.

Prince Jurij, the third son of Oton Viktor, inherited the castle in 1859 and heavily remodeled it for use as a summer home and hunting lodge. In addition to adding a story, two turrets, a terrace, and elevating the defensive walls, he also richly furnished the interior and established a surrounding English-style park.

Wishing to preserve the estate for his heirs, the prince established a fideicommiss about the property. Stocking the woods with deer and the ponds with trout, he ordered several paths built through the forest, he also hired experts to maintain the surrounding wilderness, and was the patron of the first Slovene forestry school, opened in the castle in 1869 but closed in 1875 due to germanophone political pressure. The princes' construction of a steam sawmill began the industrial development of the Lož Valley.

In 1902 prince Jurij was succeeded by his firstborn, Herman, a diplomat. After World War I the estate was divided between Kingdom of Italy and the Kingdom of Serbs, Croats and Slovenes by the Treaty of Rapallo. Prince Herman died in 1943 at the family castle of Hermsdorf by Dresden. During World War II the castle caretaker faithfully guarded the estate, repelling looters; as a consequence, the interior furnishing of the Schoenburgs survive intact. In 1945, the castle and estate were nationalized, and became a hunting lodge reserved for important state functionaries. In 1983, the castle was opened to the public as a museum.

== Architecture ==
Grave markers looted from the ruins of an ancient Roman outpost in Šmarata were incorporated into the castle's facade. The four-story building is surrounded by a renaissance-era wall. The castle was heavily remodeled in the second half of the 19th century; the majority of the interior furnishings date from this period, as do the castle parkgrounds, which are characterized by numerous meadows connected by riding and walking paths, bordered with numerous chestnut and linden tree rows, and which contain two small artificial lakes filled by Obrh and Brezno creeks.

An engraving in Valvasor's 1689 The Glory of the Duchy of Carniola depicts Snežnik (as "Schneeperg"); while of generally similar appearance and layout as today; the twin round and diagonally square corner turrets guarding the main gate were then smaller, square wooden watchtowers. The engraving also shows the castle's defensive ditch had not yet been flooded and was traversed by a simple wooden bridge had instead of a twin-arched stone one.

== Sources ==
- Description of the castle from Zaplana.net
- On renovating the castle - Structural Funds of the EU, European Fund for Regional Development
- History of the castle
