= Black Sea deluge hypothesis =

Hypothetical flood scenario

Map of the Black Sea

The Black Sea deluge is the best known of three hypothetical flood scenarios for the Late Quaternary history of the Black Sea that have been proposed since 1997. One other flood scenario proposes a rapid, even catastrophic, rise in sea level of the Black Sea. The maximum depth of the Bosporus and Dardanelles straits is 110 meters (360 ft) and 103 meters (338 ft), respectively, which would put them above the ocean levels in the Last Glacial Maximum, some 125 meters (410 ft) lower than in present times. The hypothesis is controversial, with other authors arguing for a more gradual inundation of the Black Sea.

== History ==
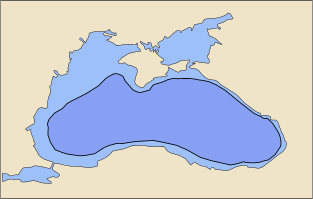
Black Sea today (light blue) and 7550 years ago (dark blue) according to the hypothesis by Ryan and Pitman

In 1997, William Ryan, Walter Pitman, Petko Dimitrov, and their colleagues first published the Black Sea deluge hypothesis. They proposed that a catastrophic inflow of Mediterranean seawater into the Black Sea freshwater lake occurred around 7,600 years ago, c. 5600 BCE.

As proposed, the Early Holocene Black Sea flood scenario describes events that would have profoundly affected prehistoric settlement in Eastern Europe and adjacent parts of Asia and possibly was the basis of oral history concerning the myth of Noah's flood. Some archaeologists support this theory as an explanation for the lack of Neolithic sites in northern Turkey. In 2003, Ryan and coauthors revised the dating of the early Holocene flood to 8,800 years ago, c. 6800 BCE.

Before that date, glacial meltwater had turned the Black and Caspian seas into vast freshwater lakes draining into the Aegean Sea. As glaciers retreated, some of the rivers emptying into the Black Sea declined in volume and changed course to drain into the North Sea. The levels of the lakes dropped through evaporation, while changes in worldwide hydrology caused global sea levels to rise.

The rising Mediterranean finally spilled over a rocky sill at the Bosporus. The event flooded 100,000 km^{2} (39,000 sq mi) of land and significantly expanded the Black Sea shoreline to the north and west. According to these researchers, 50 km^{3} (10 cu mi) of water poured through each day. The Bosporus valley roared and surged at full spate for at least 300 days. They argued that the catastrophic inflow of seawater resulted from an abrupt sea-level jump that accompanied the Laurentide Ice Sheet collapse and the ensuing breach of a bedrock barrier in the Bosporus strait.

=== Popular press accounts ===
Popular discussion of this early Holocene Black Sea flood scenario was headlined in The New York Times in December 1996 and later published as a book. In a series of expeditions widely covered by mainstream media, a team of marine archaeologists led by Robert Ballard identified what appeared to be ancient shorelines, freshwater snail shells, drowned river valleys, tool-worked timbers, and man-made structures in roughly 100 metres (330 ft) of water off the Black Sea coast of modern Turkey.

== Late Pleistocene Great Flood hypothesis ==
In 2003 and 2007, a more ancient catastrophic flood scenario was proposed by Andrei L. Chepalyga for the Late Quaternary sea level rise of the Black Sea. The hypothesis for a "Late Pleistocene Great Flood" argues that a brackish Neoeuxinian Lake, which occupied the Black Sea basin, was rapidly inundated by glacial meltwater overflow from the Caspian Sea via the Manych-Kerch Spillway shortly after the Late Glacial Maximum, about 17,000–14,000 years ago. These extensive meltwater flooding events linked several lacustrine and marine water bodies, starting with the southern edge of the Scandinavian Peninsula and southward, through spillways to the Manych-Kerch and Bosporus, ultimately forming what has been referred to as the Cascade of Eurasian Basins. This event is argued to have caused a rapid, if not catastrophic, rise in the level of the Black Sea. It might have imposed substantial stresses upon contemporary human populations and remained in cultural memory as the Great Flood. The authors also suggested that the event might have stimulated the beginning of shipping and horse domestication.

== Black Sea gradual inundation hypothesis ==
In addition to the early Holocene "Noah's Flood" scenario proposed by Ryan, Pitman, Dimitrov, and their colleagues and the Caspian Sea overflow scenario of Chepalyga, the non-catastrophic progressive flood model (or gradual inflow model) has been proposed to explain the Late Quaternary sea level history of the Black Sea.

About 8,000 years ago, the level of the Marmara Sea would have risen high enough for two-way flow to start. The evidence used to support this scenario includes the disparate ages of sapropel deposition in the eastern Mediterranean Sea and Black Sea; buried back-stepping barrier islands observed on the Black Sea shelf; and an under-water delta in the Marmara Sea, near the Bosporus Strait, composed of Black Sea sediments.

== Counter-arguments ==
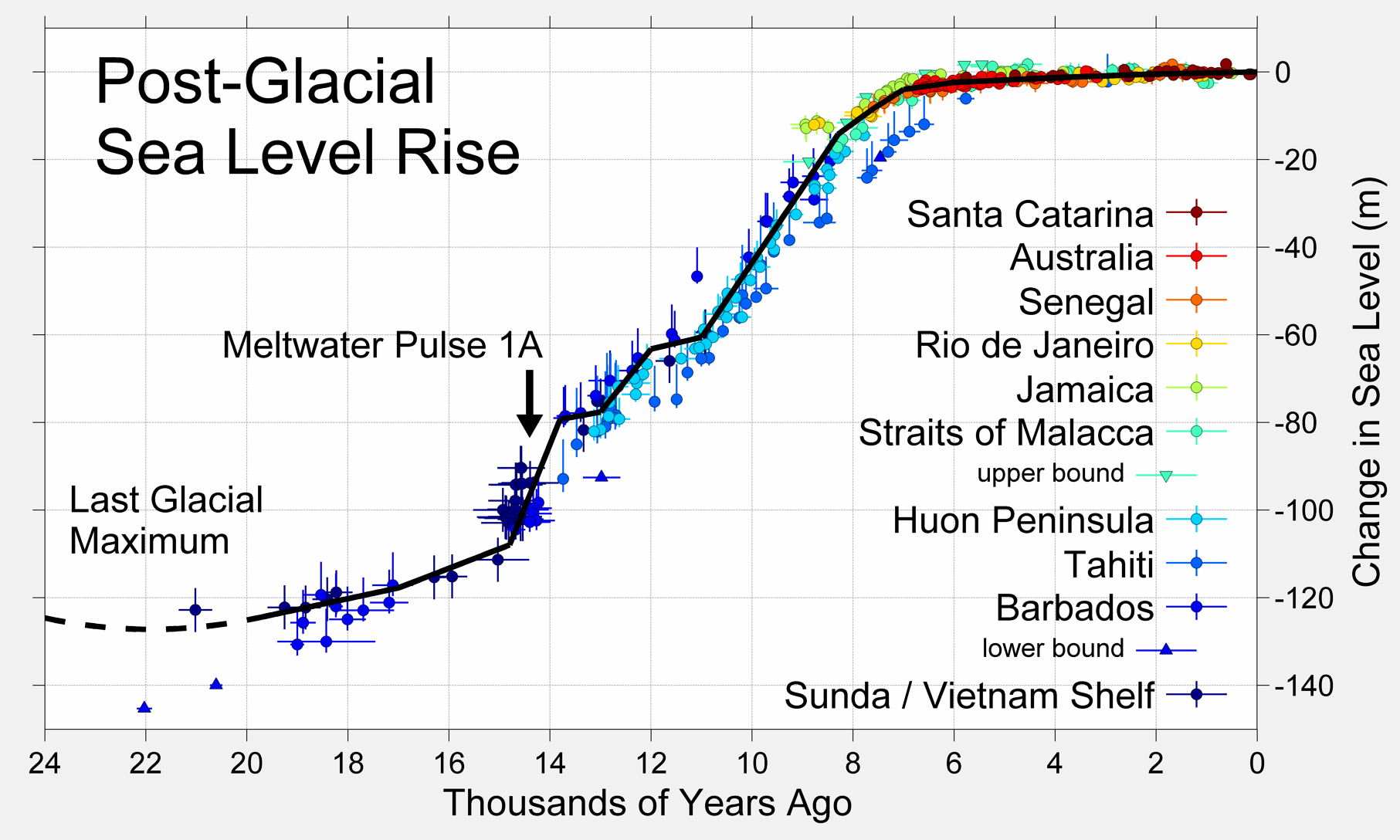
Sea levels since the Last Glacial Maximum, c. 20 kya

Criticisms of the deluge hypothesis hinge on two main lines of arguments. The first mainly focuses on the water level of the Black Sea: if the magnitude and pace of the rise of the Black Sea level was moderate enough, or if it even outpaced the rise in the Aegean basin (with water flowing, when they reconnected, from the former to the latter as it does now), or if the straits were already opened (at a lower level than now) and the two basins already connected at the time of the hypothesised flood, the catastrophe hypothesis is voided. The second is the lack of archaeological evidence one would expect of a flood, such as impact on geology, wildlife or humans.

Since the end of the last glacial period, the global sea level has risen 120 m (390 ft). The flood hypothesis hinges on the geomorphology of the Bosporus since the end of the glacial age. The Black Sea area has been isolated and reconnected many times during the last 500,000 years.

Opponents of the deluge hypothesis point to clues that water was flowing out of the Black Sea basin as late as 15,000 years ago.

In this alternative scenario, much depends on the evolution of the Bosporus. According to a study from 2001, the modern sill is 32–34 m (105–112 ft) below sea level and consists of Quaternary sand over-lying Paleozoic bedrock in which three sills are found at 80–85 m (260–280 ft) below sea level. Sedimentation on these sills started before 10,000 years ago and continued until 5,300 years ago.

A large part of the academic geological community also continues to reject the idea that there could have been enough sustained long-term pressure by water from the Aegean to dig through a supposed isthmus at the present Bosporus or enough of a difference in water levels, if any, between the two water basins.

In 2007, a research anthology on the topic was published which made much of the earlier Russian research available in English for the first time and combined it with more recent scientific findings.

The level in the Black Sea before the marine reconnection was estimated to have been 30 m (100 ft) below present sea level, rather than 80 m (260 ft) of the catastrophe theories or even lower; if the flood occurred at all, the sea level increase and the flooded area during the reconnection were significantly smaller than previously proposed. Since the depth of the Bosporus, in its middle furrow, at present varies from 36 to 124 m (118 to 407 ft), with an average depth of 65 m (213 ft), a calculated Stone Age shoreline in the Black Sea lying 30 m (100 ft) lower than in the present day would imply that the contact with the Mediterranean might never have been broken during the Holocene, and hence there could have been no sudden waterfall-style transgression. The flooding could have been "not so big".

In 2011, several authors concluded that "there is no underwater archaeological evidence to support any catastrophic submergence of prehistoric Black Sea settlements during the late Pleistocene or early Holocene intervals".

A 2012 study based on process length variation of the dinoflagellate cyst Lingulodinium machaerophorum shows no evidence for catastrophic flooding. However, Geophysical, geochronological, and geochemical evidence points to a "fast transgression" of the submergence lasting between 10 and 200 years.

A 2022 literature review concluded that there was insufficient evidence for a flood scenario. It was more likely that the waters of the Black Sea itself gradually outflowed to the Mediterranean. There was also no archaeological evidence of humans evacuating the area during the relevant time.

== See also ==
- Black Sea undersea river – Saline water current in the Black Sea
- Altai flood – Prehistoric event in Central Asia
- Flood myth – Myth in which a great flood destroys civilization
- Noah's Ark – Vessel in the Genesis flood narrative
- 4.2 kiloyear event – Severe climatic event starting around 2200 BC
- 5.9 kiloyear event – North Atlantic ice rafting events
- 8.2 kiloyear event – Rapid global cooling about 8,200 years ago
- West Siberian Glacial Lake – Periglacial lake of the Weichselian Glaciation
- Zanclean flood – Theoretical refilling of the Mediterranean Sea between the Miocene and Pliocene Epochs, flooding of the Mediterranean
