= Black Sea undersea river =

Saline water current in the Black Sea

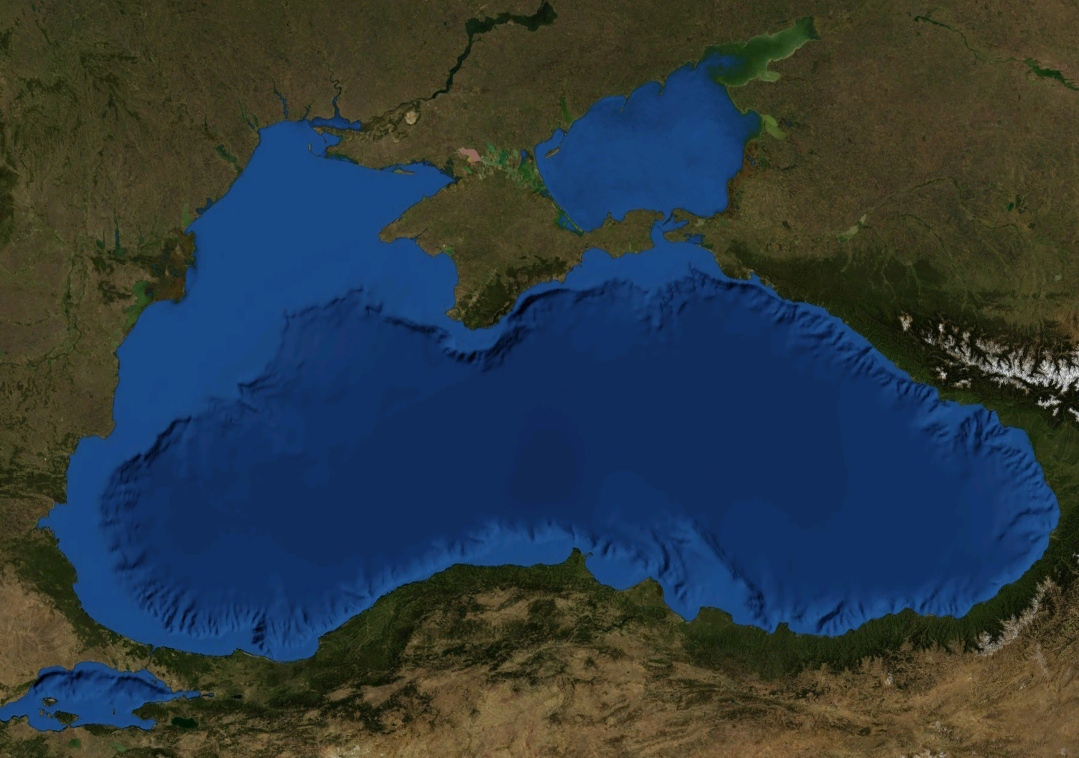
The Bosphorus Strait can be seen at lower left of this illustration of the Black Sea, from NASA’s World Wind globe software.

The Black Sea undersea river is a current of particularly saline water flowing through the Bosphorus Strait and along the seabed of the Black Sea. The discovery of the river, announced on 1 August 2010, was made by scientists at the University of Leeds, and is the first of its kind in the world. The undersea river stems from salty water spilling through the Bosphorus Strait from the Mediterranean Sea into the Black Sea, where the water has a lower salt content.

The river system formed roughly 7,500 years ago when the Bosphorus developed its two-way depth-separated flow.

Scientists have previously discovered channels running along ocean floors, based on sonar scanning. One of the largest of these runs from the mouth of the Amazon River into the Atlantic Ocean. Though it was suspected that these channels might function as rivers, it was only with the discovery of the Black Sea river that this suspicion was confirmed. Because of the power and unpredictability of these streams, they have been difficult to explore directly. A team of scientists headed by Jeff Peakall and Daniel Parsons of the University of Leeds collaborated with scientists from the University of Southampton, Memorial University of Newfoundland, and the Turkish Institute of Marine Sciences. The team used the Natural Environment Research Council's Autosub3 – a 7-metre torpedo-shaped autonomous underwater vehicle – to get as close to the current as possible. The river was found to be 37 miles (60 km) long, up to 115 feet (35 m) deep and 0.6 miles (1 km) wide. Though smaller than the Amazon channel, the undersea river still carried ten times more water than the Rhine. It flows at a speed of four miles per hour (6 km/h), with 22,000 cubic metres (780,000 cu ft) passing through per second. Were it a surface river, it would rank as the sixth largest river in the world.

The river was found to contain features typical of surface rivers, such as river banks, floodplains, waterfalls and rapids. One major difference is that the underwater river, when rounding a bend, moves in currents spinning in the opposite direction from those on land. The river works as a density current, because it carries sediments along the sea floor and has a higher salinity than the surrounding water.

A secondary channel exists ~6 km east of the main channel complex. It was formed from intermittent leakage, and has eroded through several shore-parallel ridges.

== See also ==
- Black Sea deluge hypothesis
- Kuma–Manych Depression
- Subterranean river
- Underwater lake
