= Underground lake =

Lake under the Earth's surface

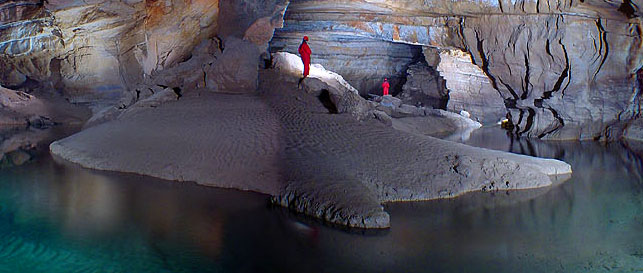
Underground lake within Cross Cave in Slovenia, one of 22 such lakes

An underground lake or subterranean lake is a lake underneath the surface of the Earth. Most naturally occurring underground lakes are found in areas of karst topography, where limestone or other soluble rock has been weathered away, leaving a cave where water can flow and accumulate.

Natural underground lakes are an uncommon hydrogeological feature. More often, groundwater gathers in formations such as aquifers or springs.

The largest underground lake in the world is in Dragon's Breath Cave in Namibia, with an area of almost 2 hectares (5 acres); the second largest is The Lost Sea, located inside Craighead Caverns in Tennessee, United States, with an area of 1.8 hectares (4.4 acres)

== Characteristics ==
An underground lake is any body of water that is similar in size to a surface lake and exists mostly or entirely underground; though, a precise scientific definition of what may be considered a "lake" is not yet well-established. Underground lakes could be classified as either "lakes" or "ponds", depending on characteristics of size, such as exposed surface area and/or depth.

The rarity of naturally occurring underground lakes can be attributed to the way water behaves underground. Below the surface of the Earth, the amount of pressure exerted on groundwater increases, causing it to be absorbed into the soil. The boundary at which there is sufficient sub-terranean pressure to completely saturate the ground with water is called the water table. The area above the water table is called the "unsaturated zone," while the area below it is called the "saturated zone". In the saturated zone, pressure becomes the primary force driving the flow of water. Lakes form primarily under the force of gravity – water is pulled down to the lowest point in an area, and gathers into a lake. Any water below the water table will be under pressure, and so does not form a lake; instead, it forms an aquifer.

Naturally occurring underground lakes can form in karst areas, where the weathering of soluble rocks leaves behind caverns and other openings in the earth. Surface water can find its way underground through these openings and pool up in larger caverns to form lakes.

Underground lakes can also be formed by human processes, such as the flooding of mines. Two examples are the lakes found in the slate mines at Blaenau Ffestiniog, such as Croesor quarry, and a lake in the Hallein Salt Mine in Austria.

== Examples ==
- Craighead Caverns, in Tennessee, United States
- Cross Cave, in Slovenia
- Dragon's Breath Cave, in Namibia
- Kow Ata, in Turkmenistan
- Lake Neuron, in Albania
- Moqua Well, in Nauru
- Saint-Léonard underground lake, in Switzerland

== Gallery ==
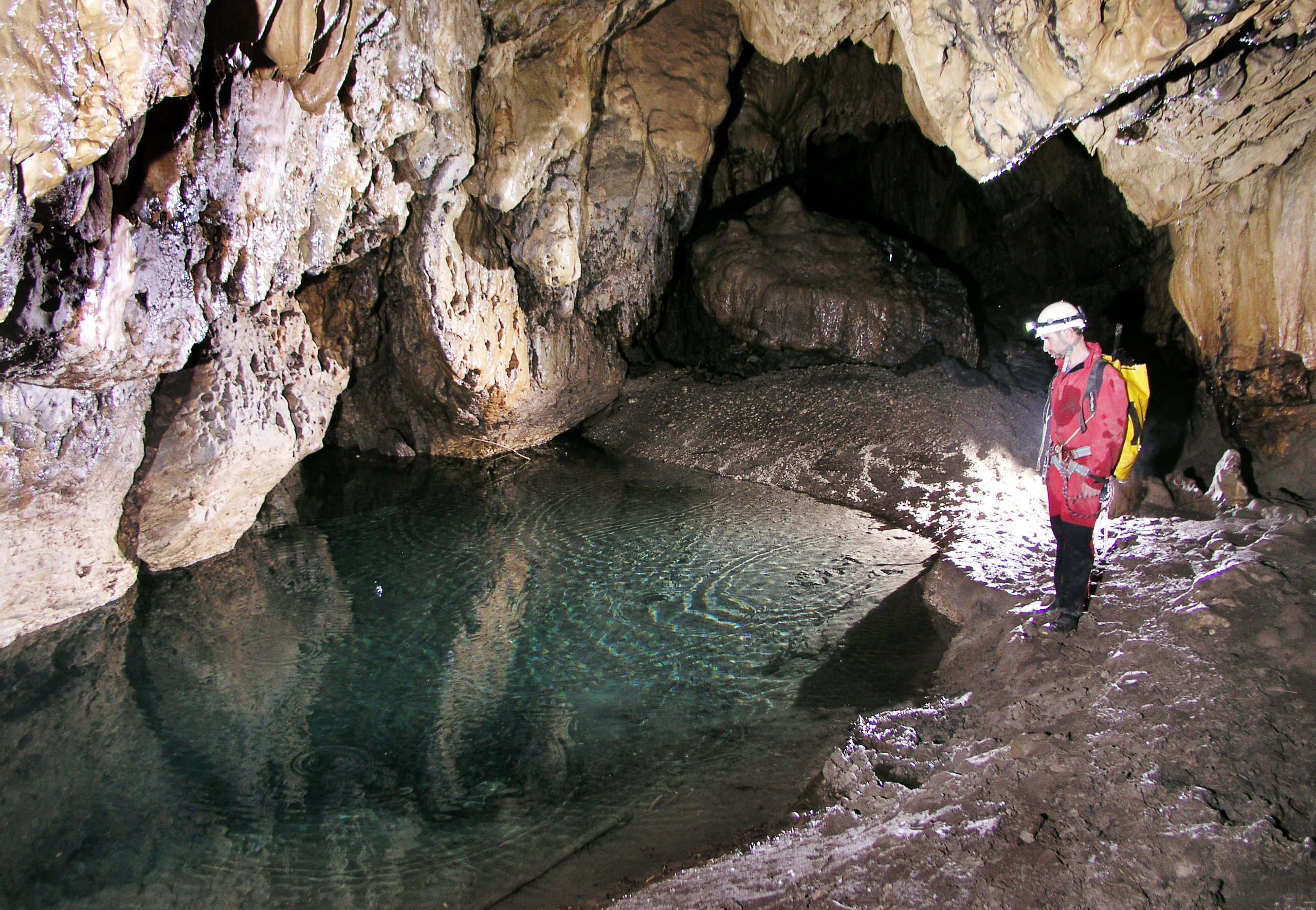
An underwater lake in Cueva Maronal located in the Elías Soplín Vargas District of Peru

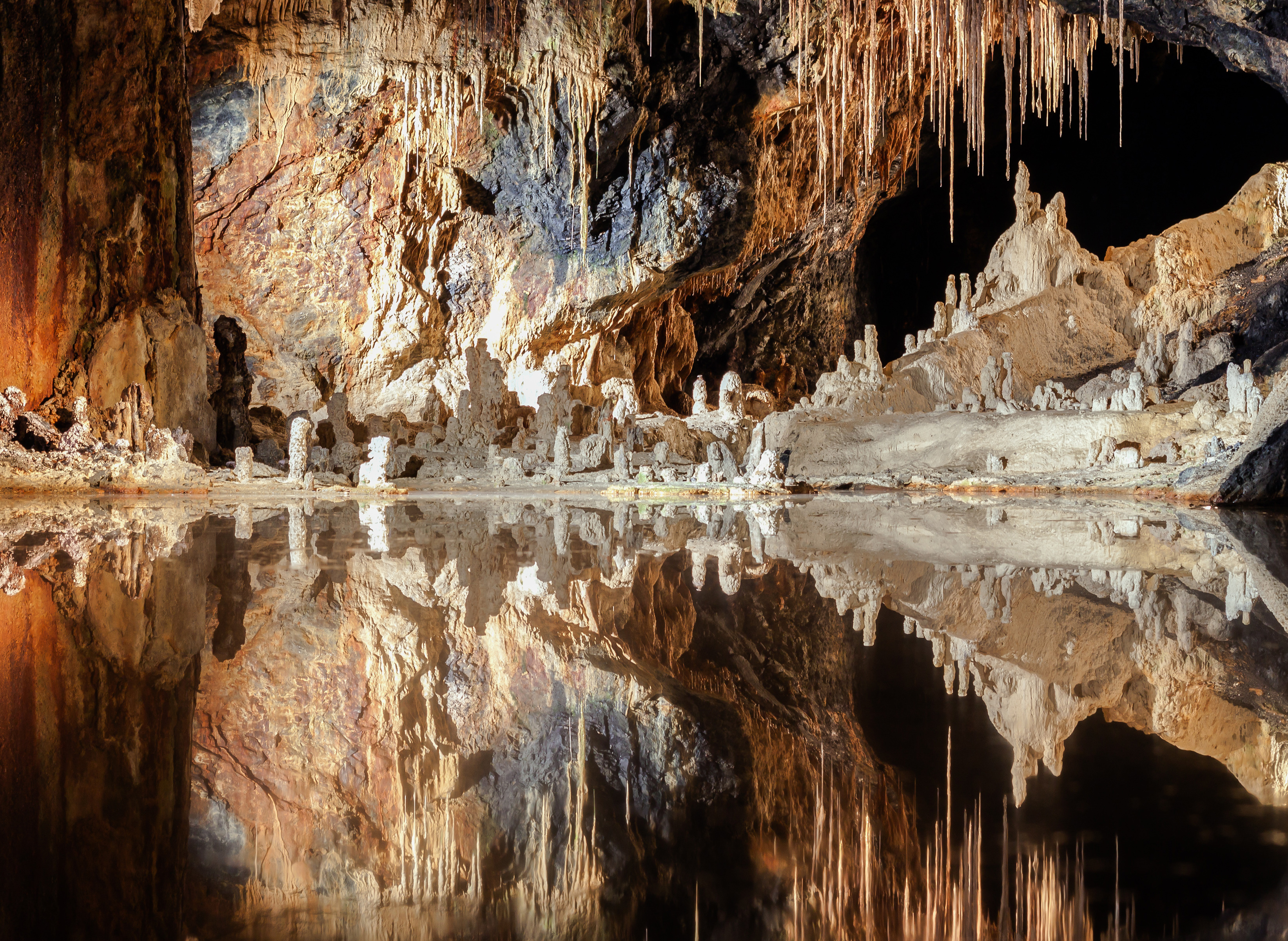
"Fairy Kingdom", a cave inside the Saalfeld Fairy Grottoes in Thuringia, Germany.

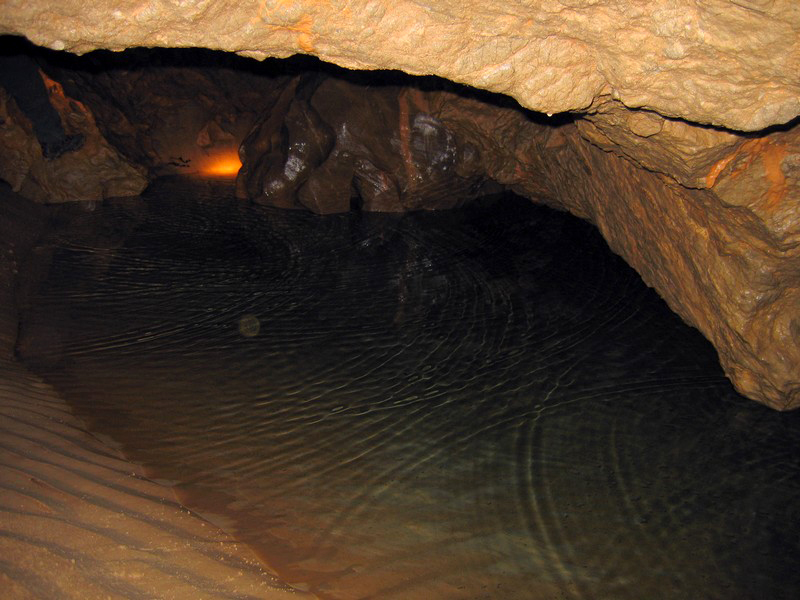
Cave of the Sergeant located in near Saint-Guilhem-le-Desert in Hérault, France.

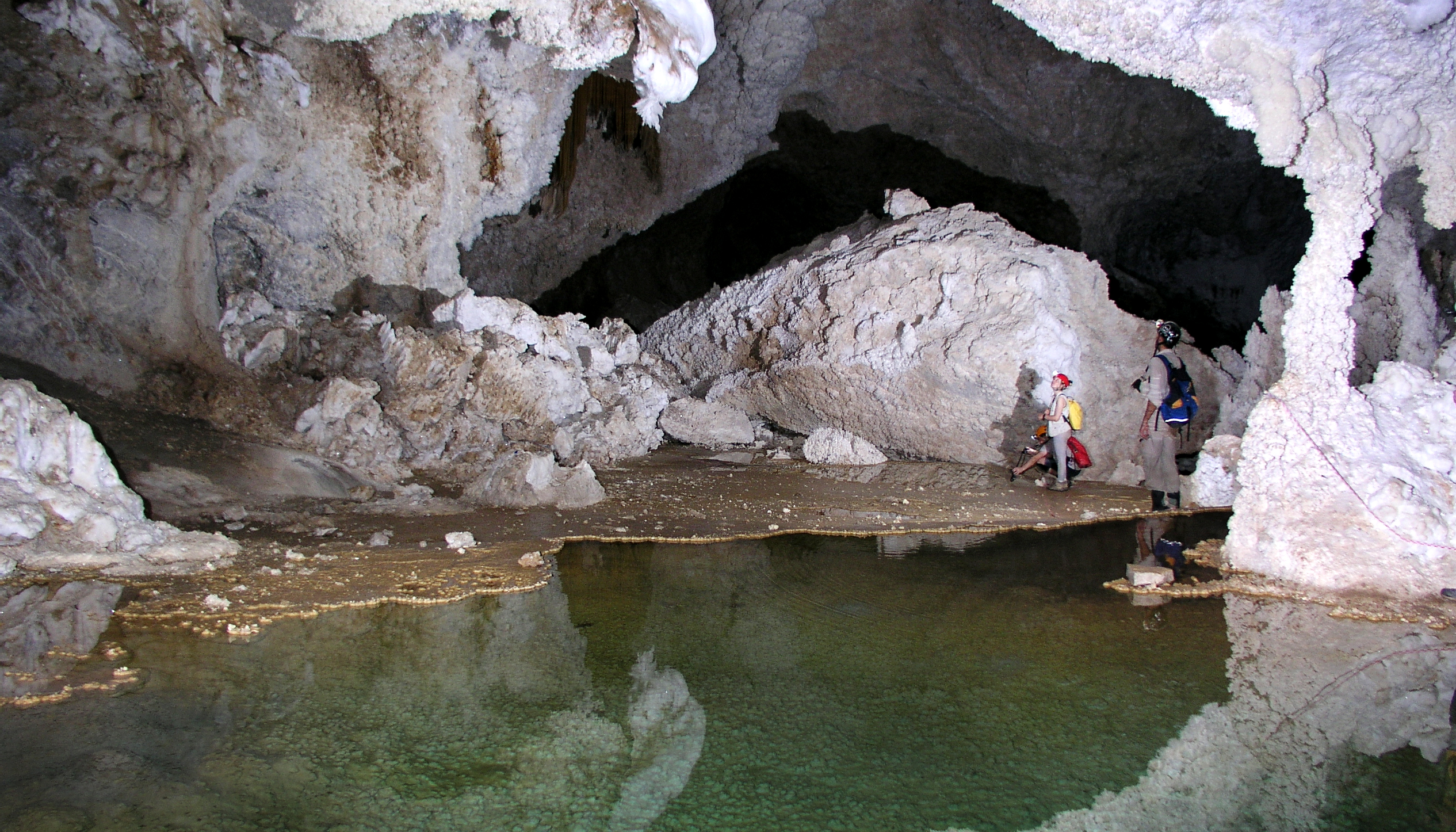
Lake Lebarge in the Lechuguilla Cave, Eddy County, New Mexico, New Mexico, United States

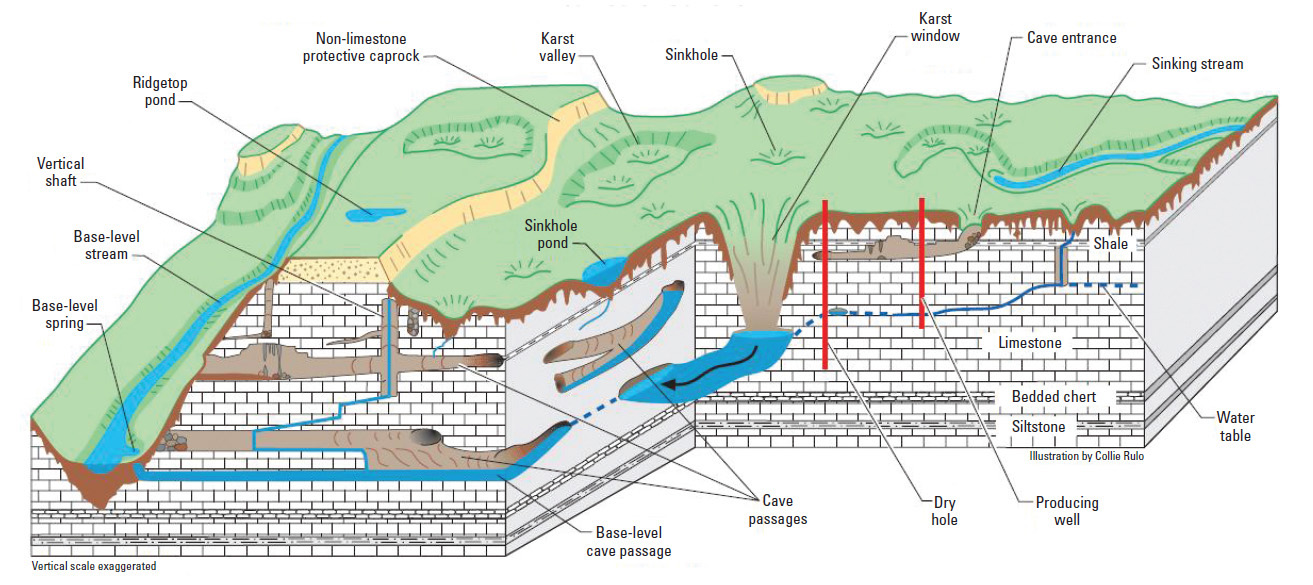
A geological cross section showing the key hydrological features of Karst topography that lead to the formation of underwater caves.

== See also ==
- Subglacial lake – Lake under a glacier
- Subterranean river – River that runs wholly or partly beneath the ground surface
- Subterranean waterfall – Waterfall located underground
- Underground ocean
