= Russell Creek (Ontario) =

- Russell Creek, circa 1818

- Historic location of the mouth of the creek in Toronto
- Etymology: Named for Peter Russell

Location
- Country: Canada
- Province: Ontario
- Region: Greater Toronto Area
- Municipality: Toronto

Physical characteristics
- Source
  - coordinates: 43°39′54″N 79°24′50″W
  - elevation: 115 m (377 ft)
- Mouth: Lake Ontario
  - coordinates: 43°38′40″N 79°23′05″W
  - elevation: 74 m (243 ft)
- Length: 3.4 km (2.1 mi)

Basin features
- River system: Great Lakes Basin
- Tributaries
  - right: Metro Creek

Russell Creek was a short creek, 3.4 kilometres (2.1 mi) long, that flowed through what is now downtown Toronto, Ontario, Canada, west of the original town of York. The creek was named for Peter Russell and flowed generally southeast, like all the other waterways in Toronto, reflecting the recent glaciation, into Toronto Harbour near the present CN Tower. The creek was buried in 1876, but traces of it can still be found, for instance on the grounds of the historic Grange mansion.

The Spadina Brewery was built on its banks, in 1837, and used its waters.

== See also ==
- List of Ontario rivers
