= Lož Karst Field =

Karst field in Slovenia

Coordinates: 45°41′56″N 14°28′42″E

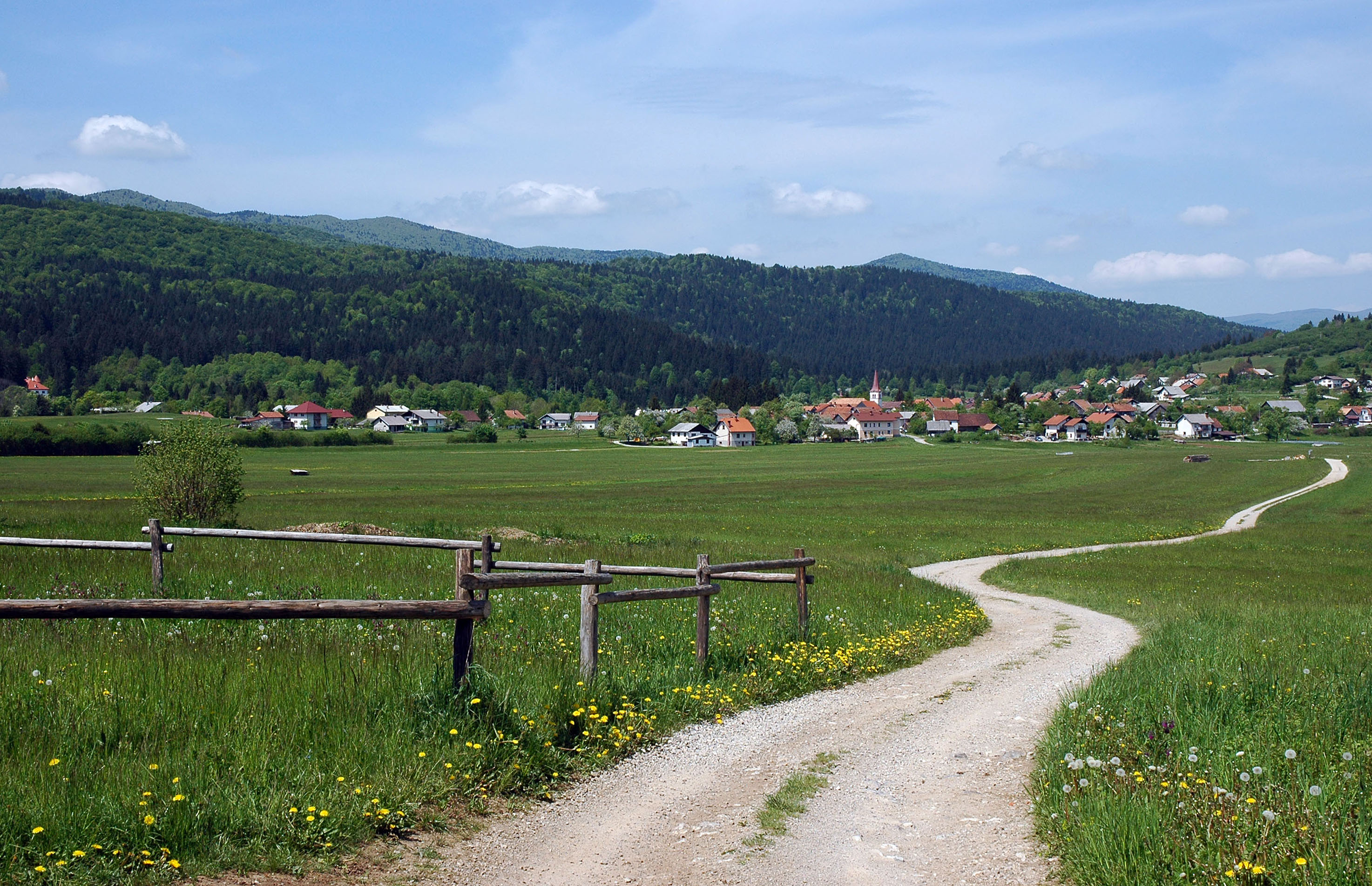
Southwest part of the Lož Karst Field

The Lož Karst Field (pronounced [ˈloːʃ]; Slovene: Loško polje), also known as the Lož Valley (Slovene: Loška dolina), is a karst field in Inner Carniola in southwest Slovenia. It is the smallest karst field in Inner Carniola.

== Geography ==
The Lož Karst Field lies between the Bloke Plateau to the north, Mount Race (Slovene: Racna gora, 1,140 meters or 3,740 feet) to the east, and Mount Snežnik to the west. It is about 6 kilometers (3.7 mi) long and 4 kilometers (2.5 mi) wide, and lies on Triassic dolomite oriented in the Dinaric direction.

Little Obrh Spring (Slovene: Izvir Mali Obrh) lies on the south edge of the karst field in Kozarišče near Snežnik Castle and is fed by water from Mount Snežnik. Big Obrh Spring (Slovene: Izvir Veliki Obrh) lies on the east side of the karst field, near Vrhnika pri Ložu, and is fed by water from Mount Race and the Potok Plateau in the Loški Potok area. The streams from the two springs join west of Pudob to create Obrh Creek, a losing stream that disappears on the north edge of the karst field into 850-meter (2,790 ft) Golobina Cave west of Dane, emerging to the west at Lake Cerknica. Flooding affects only the western part of the karst field, below Dane, which is uninhabited. In the past, more of the karst field used to flood, and so at the end of the 19th century a lower entrance was cut into the cave, which reduced the depth and duration of flooding.

== Settlements ==
The settlements in the Lož Karst Field are relatively large and have a clustered or linear layout. Stari Trg pri Ložu is the economic and cultural center of the area.

== Economic activity ==
The karst field ranges between 570 meters (1,870 ft) and 590 meters (1,940 ft) in elevation and is surrounded by steep wooded slopes. The flat areas are used for tilled fields, and lower parts near the creeks for meadows. There are also meadows and pastures along the edges of the gentler slopes, especially on the sunny sides, where animal husbandry is practiced. The wood and metal industry has developed in Stari Trg pri Ložu.
