= Saint-Léonard underground lake =

- Lac souterrain de Saint-Léonard
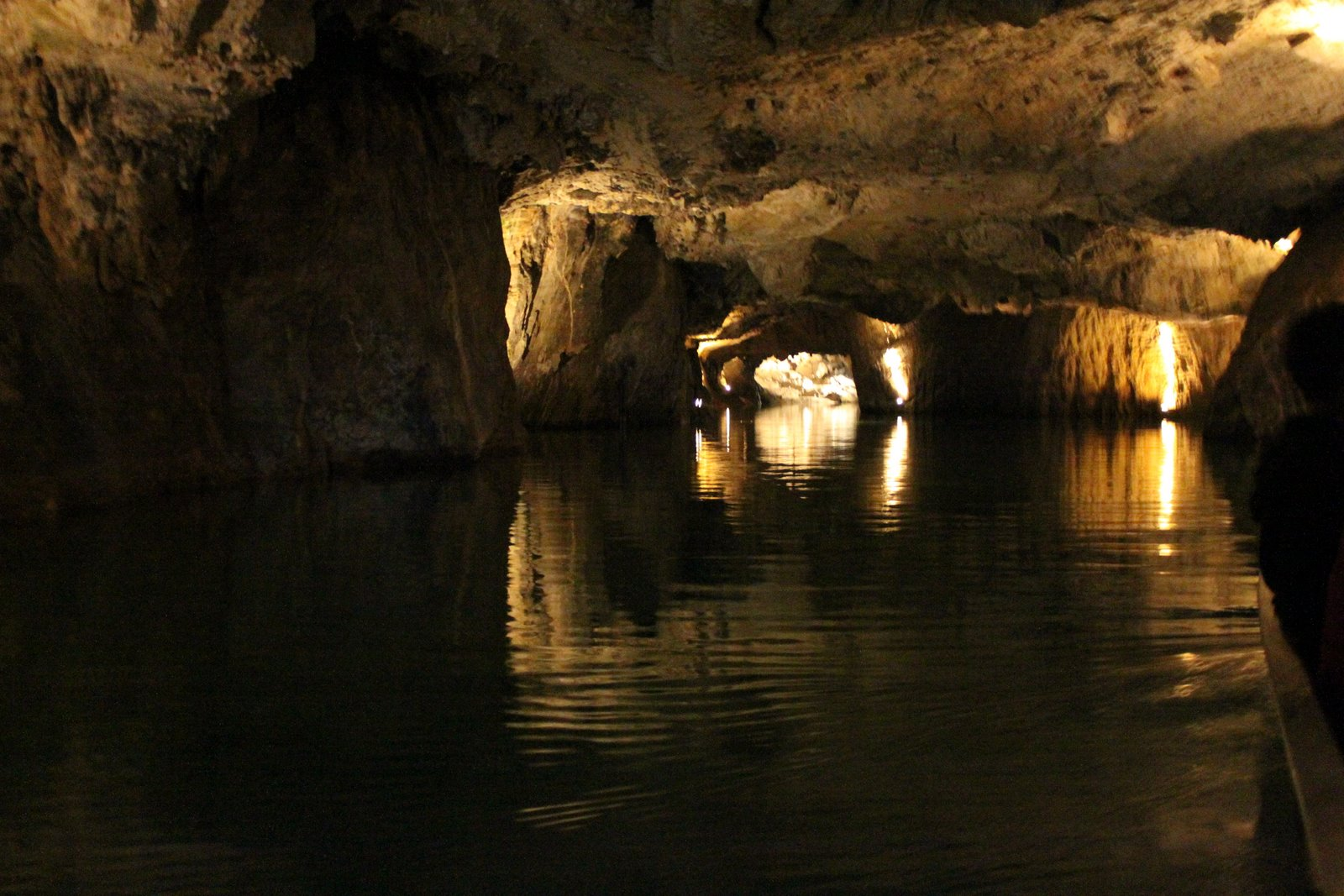

- Location within Canton of Valais Location within Switzerland Location within Alps
- Interactive map of Saint-Léonard underground lake
- Location: Saint-Léonard, Valais
- Coordinates: 46°15′23″N 7°25′32″E
- Type: underground lake
- Basin countries: Switzerland
- Max. length: 260 m (850 ft)
- Max. width: 29 m (95 ft)
- Surface area: 6,000 m^{2} (65,000 sq ft)
- Average depth: 4 m (13 ft)
- Max. depth: 13 m (43 ft)
- Surface elevation: 509 m (1,670 ft)

Saint-Léonard underground lake (French Lac souterrain de Saint-Léonard) is located at Saint Léonard in the canton of Valais, Switzerland.

== Geology ==
It is formed where a bed of Triassic gypsum, emplaced within impervious Carboniferous strata, has been dissolved by groundwater. With a length of 300 metres (980 ft) and a width of 20 metres (66 ft), it is the largest underground lake in Europe. It was discovered in 1943 by Jean-Jacques Pittard. Prior to 1946 the water-level was much higher, but an earthquake with a force of 5.6 on the Richter-scale opened additional fissures in the cave on January 25, 1946 made it more readily navigable. Its water is constantly at 11 °C (52 °F). The lake has been accessible by the public since 1949. Visits are organized daily from March 15 to November 1, from 9 am to 5 pm. The visit is about half an hour long, and is held in English, French, German and Italian. Ticket-prices are SFr 12 for adults and SFr 7 for children. The lake is accessible by boat.

Access to the lake was closed from 2000 to June 2003, whilst the stability of the site was improved by the addition of more than 5000 bolts driven into the ceiling.

== See also ==
- List of caves in Switzerland
