= Cross Cave =

Cave in Slovenia

- Cold Cave under Cross Mountain
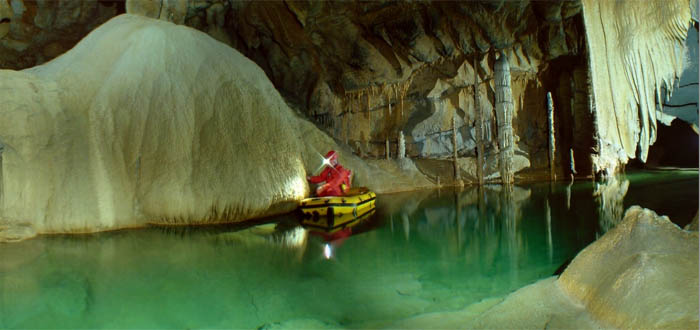
- Cross Cave at the Port of Venice (Beneški pristan)

- Location within Slovenia
- Location: southeastern Slovenia
- Coordinates: 45°44′39″N 14°27′52″E
- Depth: 32 m (105 ft)
- Length: 8,273 m (27,142 ft)
- Discovery: 1832
- Geology: dolomite, limestone
- Entrances: 1
- Access: by foot and by boat
- Cave survey: plan
- Registry: Cave E-Cadastre

Cross Cave (Slovene: Križna jama, German: Kreuzberghöhle), also named Cold Cave under Cross Mountain (Mrzla jama pod Križno goro), is a cave in Slovenia's Lož Valley, in the area between the Lož Karst Field, Cerknica Karst Field, and Bloke Plateau. The cave is named after nearby Holy Cross Church in Podlož. The cave is particularly noted for its chain of subterranean lakes. Extremely slow-growing calcareous formations (up to 0.1 mm per year) and their fragility are the main obstacle to large-scale tourism in the cave and limit daily tourist visits to the flooded part of the cave to four people. As a result, the Cross Cave is among the best-preserved caves, opened to the public in Slovenia. The cave was prepared for visits in the 1950s by the Lož Valley Tourist Association. It was later managed by the Ljubljana Cave Research Society. Since the 1990s, it has been cared for by the Friends of Cross Cave Association (Društvo ljubiteljev Križne jame). With 45 species of organisms, some not discovered until 2000, Cross Cave is the fourth-largest cave ecosystem in the world in terms of biodiversity. The cave was first documented in 1832, but the part of the cave that includes lakes and stream passages was first explored by Slovene cavers in 1926.

On January 6, 2024, five people were trapped in the cave due to high water levels caused by heavy rainfall. They were rescued on January 8, 2024.

== Course ==
At Calvary (Kalvarija, the best-known symbol of Cross Cave), the cave splits into two branches: the Muds to the north and the Variegated Passage to the northeast. The passage through the Muds is more difficult, and so most visitors choose to continue through the Variegated Passage, which requires the use of small boats. Cross Cave continues into New Cross Cave (Nova Križna jama). In the direction from the entrance to the cave, the Variegated Passage is the left gallery of Cross Cave at the confluence with the Muds at Cavalry. The access requires the use of boats. Part of the way along the Variegated Passage is a side gallery named the Matjaž Passage (Matjažev rov), and it contains several large columns. Continuing along the Variegated Passage, visitors enter the Crystal Mountain (Kristalna gora), the largest room in the cave. They can climb a mountainous pile of collapsed rocks to a point well above the stream.

== Archeological site ==
Cross Cave exhibits one of the largest deposits of cave bear skeletons in this part of Europe. Over two thousand cave bear bones have been found in the cave. In addition to the abundance of cave bear bones, ceramic and lyrical remains from the eneolithic period were discovered at the entrance of the cave at the beginning of the first lake.

== Incident ==
On 6 January 2024 at 8:00 a.m., a group of three, together with a guide and a trainee guide, went on a tour of the cave, although it was unsuitable for a visit at that time due to weather conditions. When the group had not returned by the scheduled time of 3:00 p.m., other guides went to look for them. Failing to locate the group, the Cave Rescue Service (JRS) was activated at approximately 5:25 p.m.

At around 4:00 a.m., the rescuers found the missing persons at a location in a cave called Cross Mountain, on a ledge elevated 10 m (33 ft) above the high water level, located about 2 km (1.2 mi) from the entrance to the cave under Cross Mountain. All those were safe and in good health. They were evacuated on the afternoon of 8 January.

== See also ==
- List of longest Dinaric caves
