= Kozarišče =

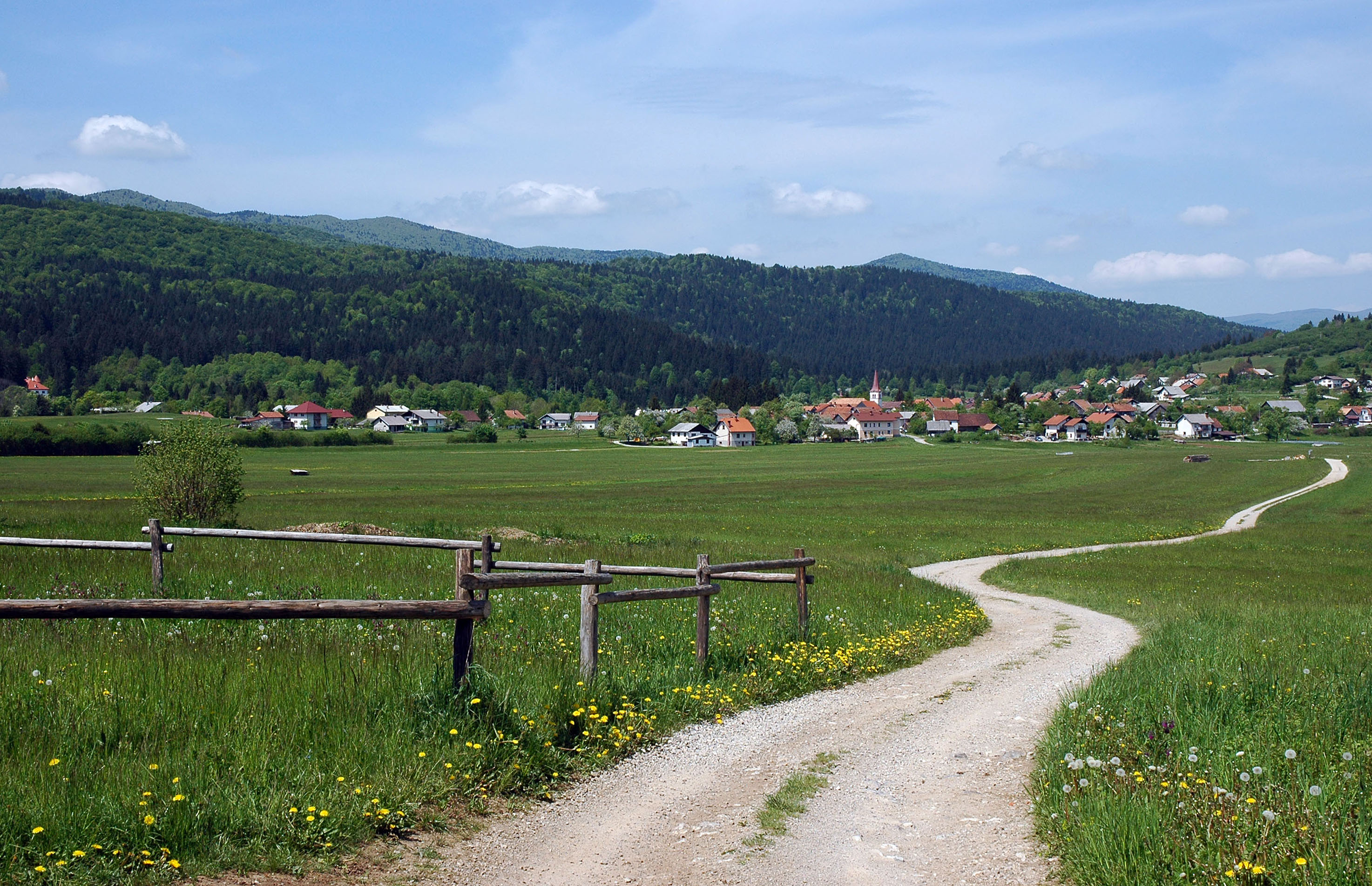

- Location in Slovenia
- Coordinates: 45°41′9.7″N 14°28′29.62″E
- Country: Slovenia
- Traditional region: Inner Carniola
- Statistical region: Littoral–Inner Carniola
- Municipality: Loška Dolina

Area
  - Total: 43.76 km^{2} (16.90 sq mi)
- Elevation: 579.6 m (1,902 ft)

Population (2002)
  - Total: 241

Kozarišče (pronounced [kɔˈzaːɾiʃtʃɛ], in older sources Kozaršče, German: Kosarsche, Italian: Cosarsca) is a village south of Stari Trg pri Ložu in the Municipality of Loška Dolina in the Inner Carniola region of Slovenia. The area of the village extends south of the main settlement right to the Snežnik Plateau and to the border with Croatia. Snežnik Castle, a 13th-century castle, is located just southwest of the village.

== Church ==
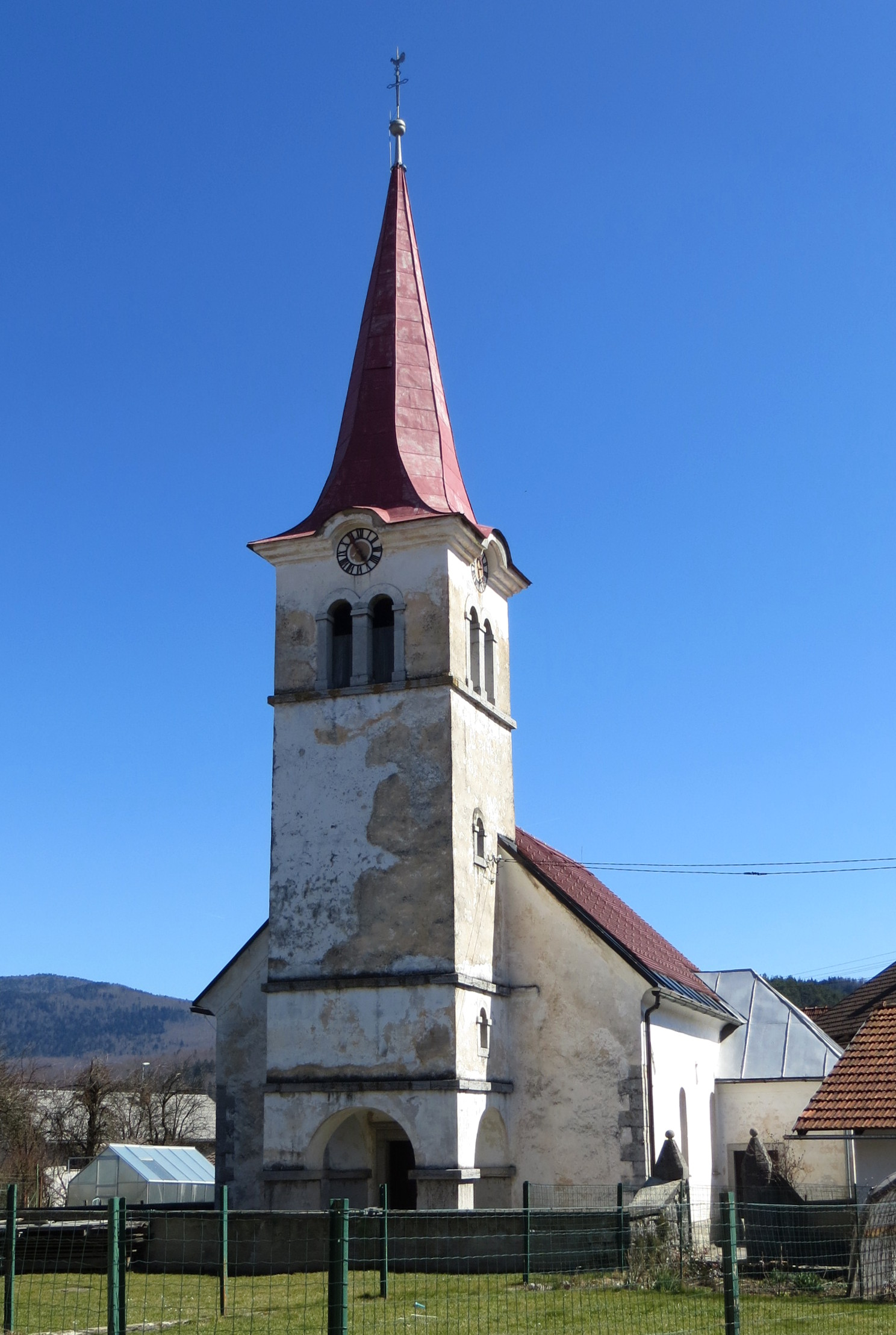
Saint Benedict's Church

The local church in the settlement dates to the mid-16th century and is dedicated to Saint Benedict and belong to the Parish of Stari Trg pri Ložu.

== Mass graves ==
Kozarišče is the site of two known mass graves associated with the Second World War. The Kozlovka Cave Mass Grave (Slovene: Grobišče Jama Kozlovka) is located in a spruce woods along the road from Kozarišče to Knežak. It is a 56-meter (184 ft) deep shaft that contains the remains of Slovene anticommunist militia members. The Grobnica Mass Grave (Grobišče Grobnica) is located in the forest southwest of the settlement. It contains an undetermined number of victims.
