= Flag of Quintana Roo =

- Use: Civil and state flag
- Proportion: 4:7
- Adopted: January 1, 2016
- Design: Solid white with the Quintana Roo coat of arms in the center.

The Flag of Quintana Roo is the flag used by the Mexican state of Quintana Roo. The flag was adopted January 1, 2016. The State Flag consists of a white rectangle with a ratio of four to seven between the height and width; in the center it bears the State Coat of arms. Legally, the coat of arms should occupy one third of the height and width in the same 4-to-7 ratio. However, in reality it does not, as it is taller than it is wide; it is either set large at one third the width or small at one third the height.

== History ==
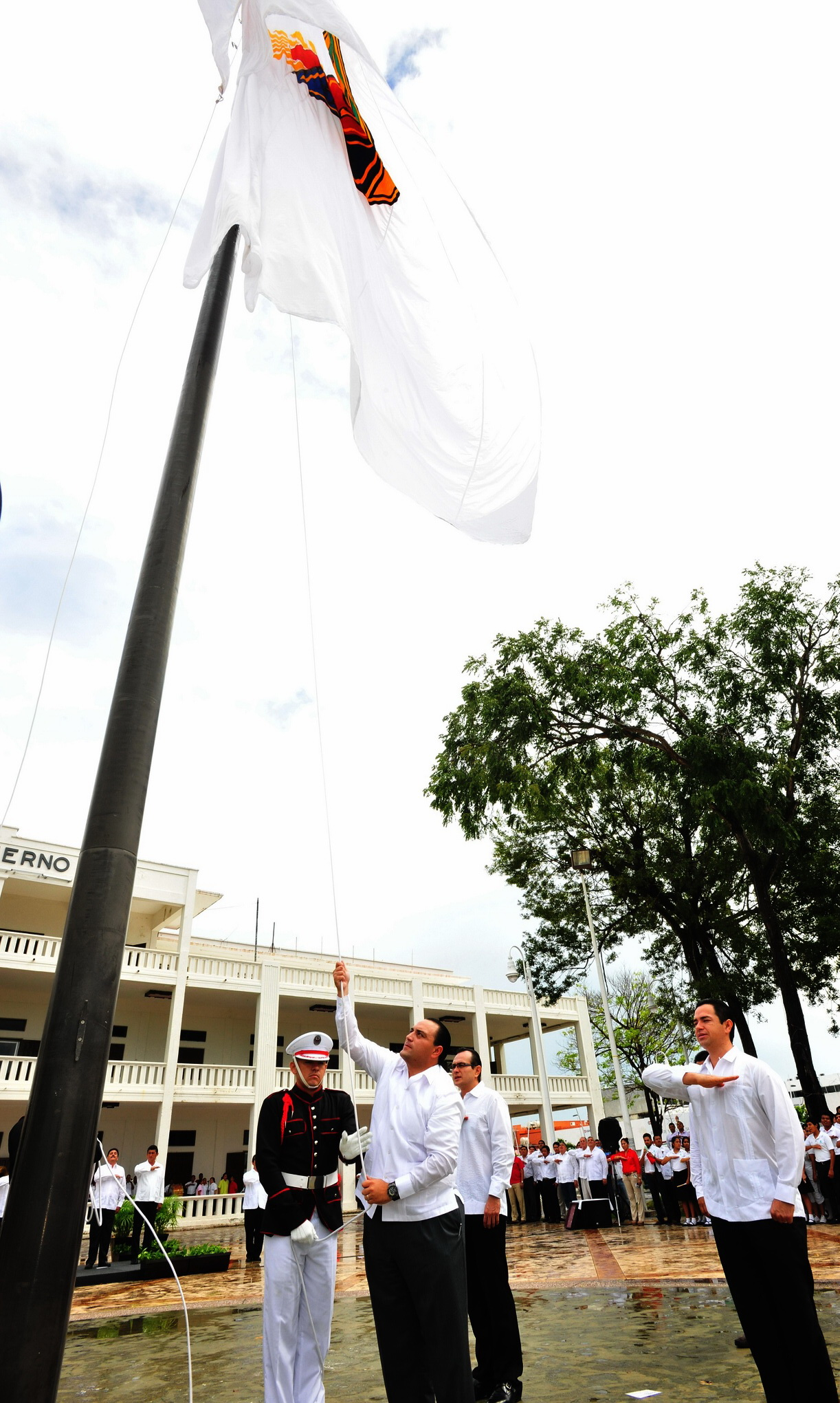
The flag of Quintana Roo flying

Formerly, the current territory of the state of Quintana Roo belonged to the state of Yucatan. The first flag was flown on March 16, 1841, when it was hoisted on the Ayuntamiento municipal building in the "Plaza Grande" of Mérida, the capital city of the state of Yucatán as the Republic of Yucatán. This action was a protest against the centralism of Mexican president Antonio López de Santa Anna.

The first flag of the state of Quintana Roo was officially adopted on January 1, 2016, it is a white banner with the entity's coat of arms.

=== Other flags ===
Flag of the Republic of Yucatán.

== See also ==
- Flag of Mexico
- Coat of arms of Quintana Roo
