= Muyil =

Archaeological site in Mexico

Muyil or Chunyaxché
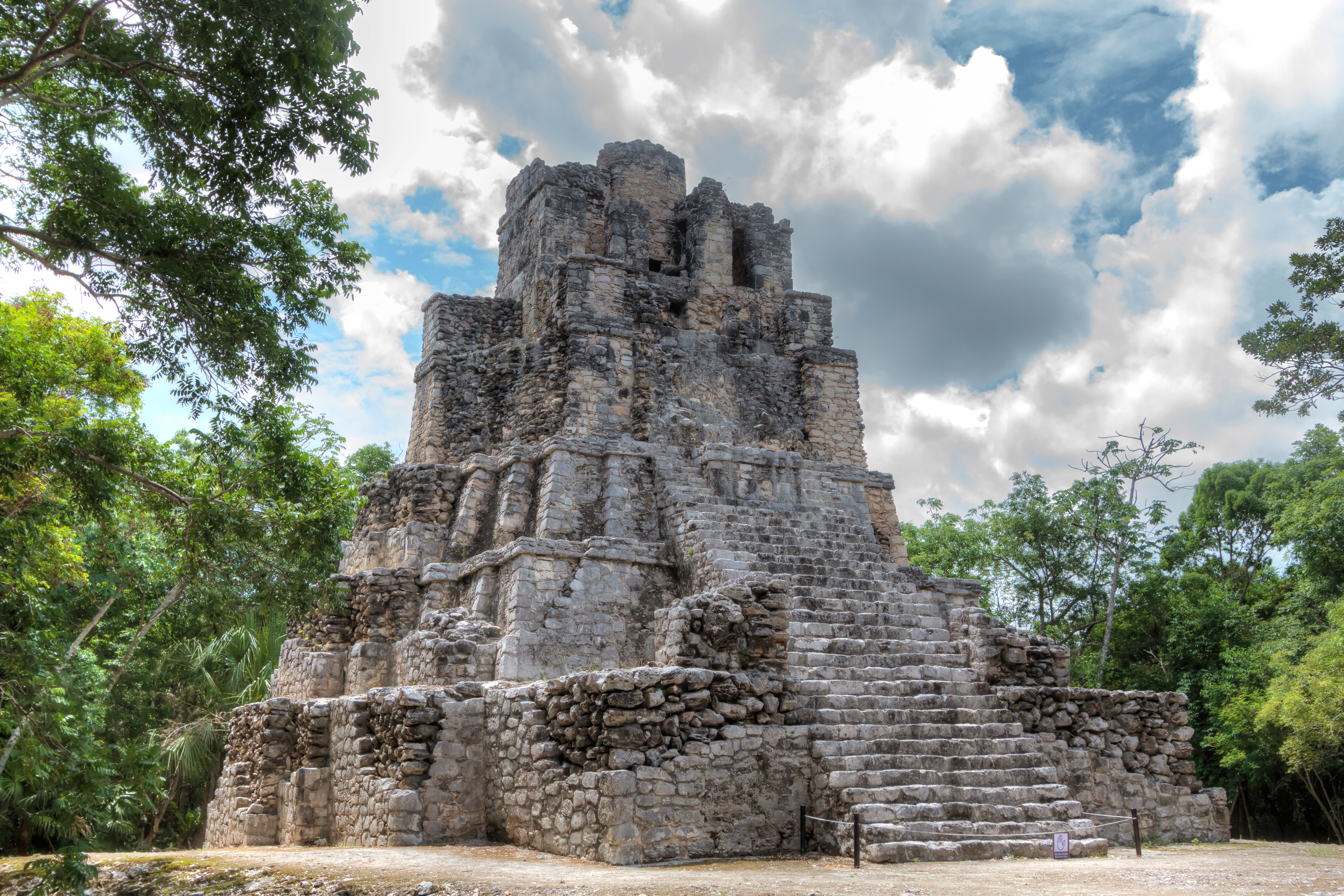
- Ruins of a pyramid

- Location within
- 20°04′40″N 87°36′55″W
- Cultures: Maya
- Location: Mexico

Muyil (also known as Chunyaxché) was one of the earliest and longest inhabited ancient Maya sites on the eastern coast of the Yucatan Peninsula. It is located approximately 15 kilometres (9.3 mi) south of the coastal site of Tulum, in the Municipality of Felipe Carrillo Puerto in the state of Quintana Roo, Mexico. Artifacts found here date back from as early as 350 BC. to as late as 1200-1500 AD. The ruins of Muyil are an example of Peten architecture, like those found in southern Mayan sites with their steep walled pyramids such as Tikal in Guatemala. It is situated on the Sian Ka'an lagoon, a name meaning "Where the Sky is Born". Muyil was located along a trade route on the Caribbean once accessible via a series of canals. Among the most commonly traded goods were Jade, obsidian, chocolate, honey, feathers, chewing gum, and salt. It is believed that throughout much of its history, Muyil had strong ties to the center of Coba located some 44 kilometres (27 mi) the north / northwest. The 2010 federal census reported a population of 191 inhabitants in the locality.

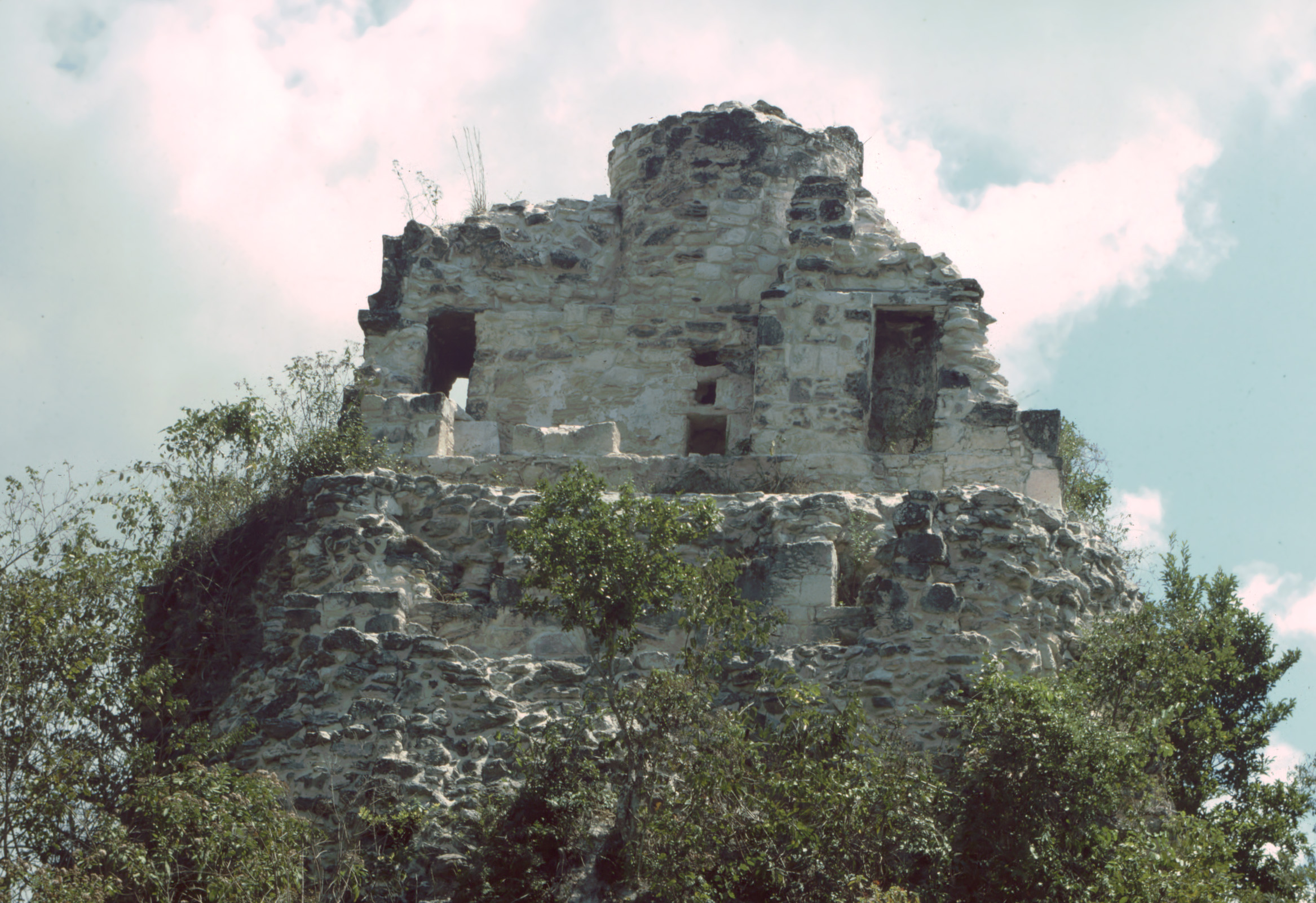
Temple on the top of pyramid in Muyil

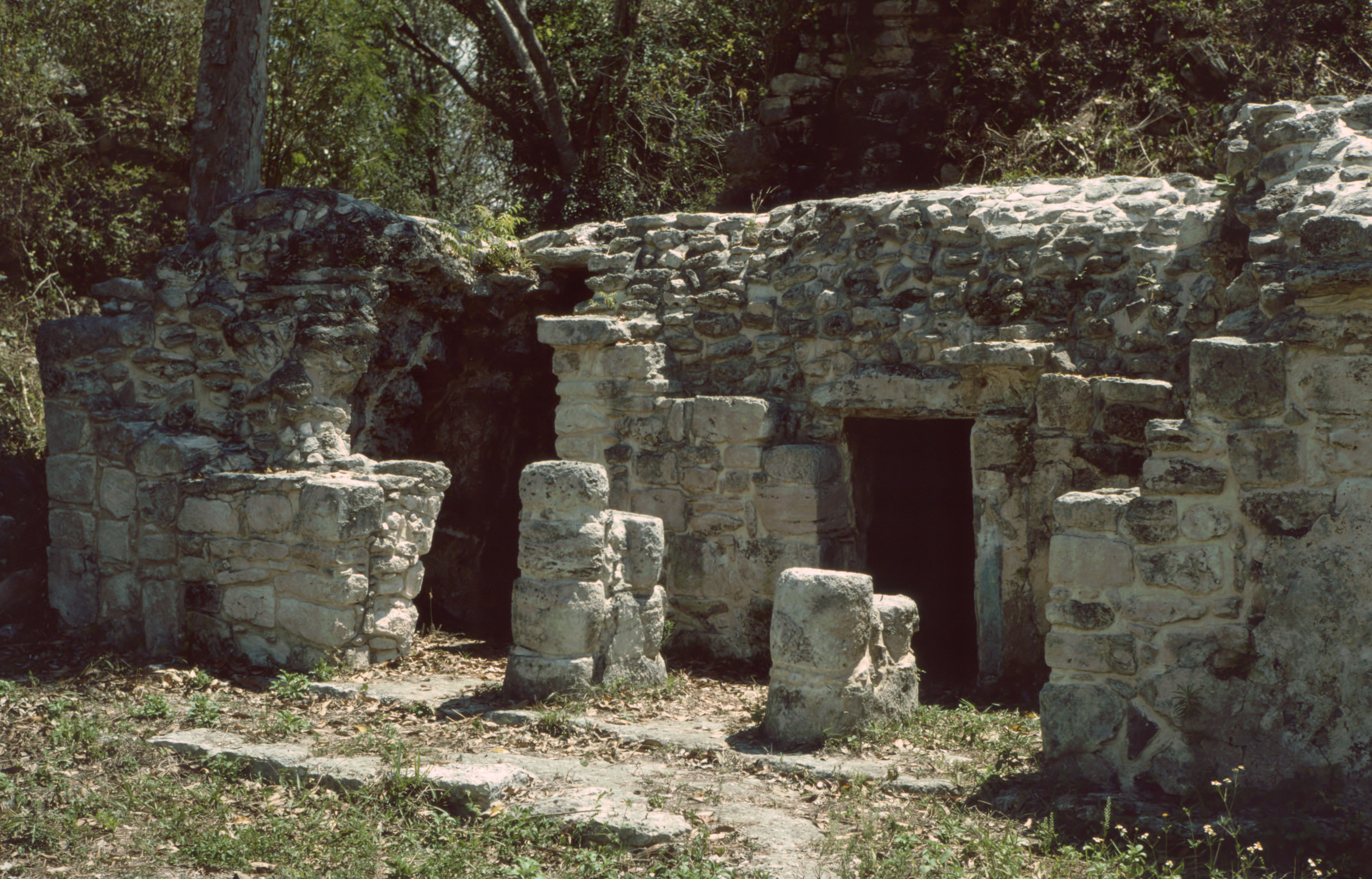
Post-classical building at the foot of the pyramid

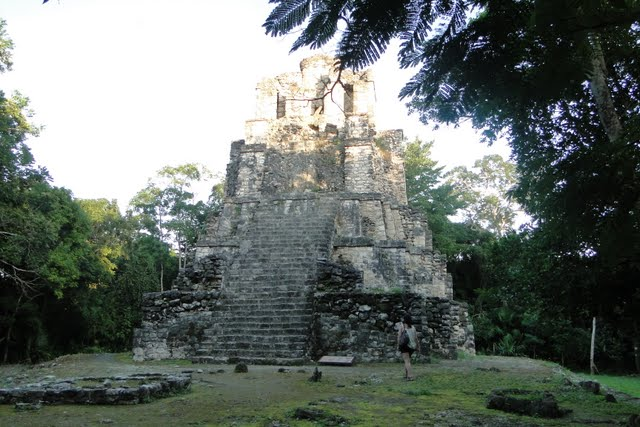
Pyramid

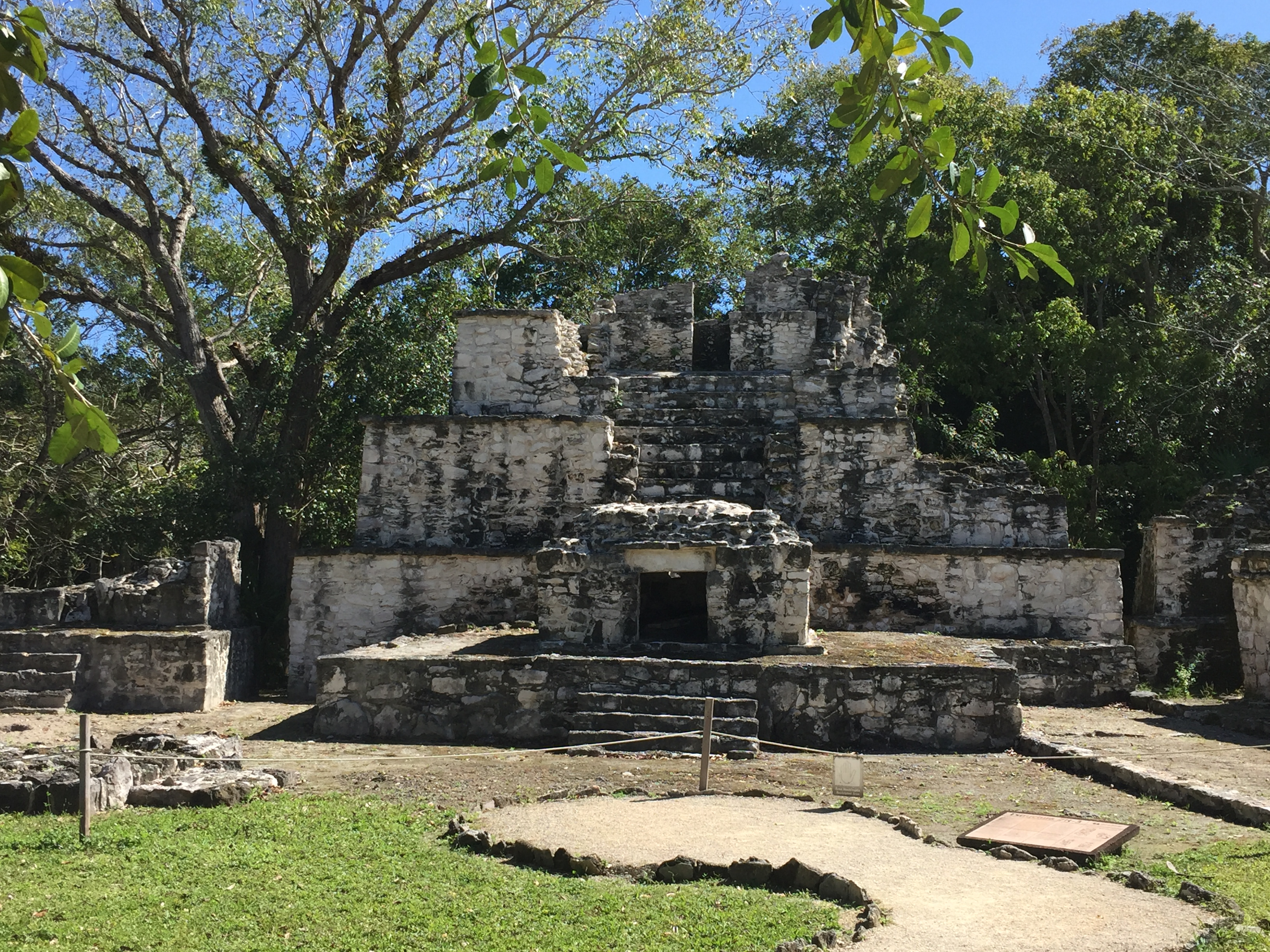
Structure 7H3, or building number 5 of the self-guided Muyil tour

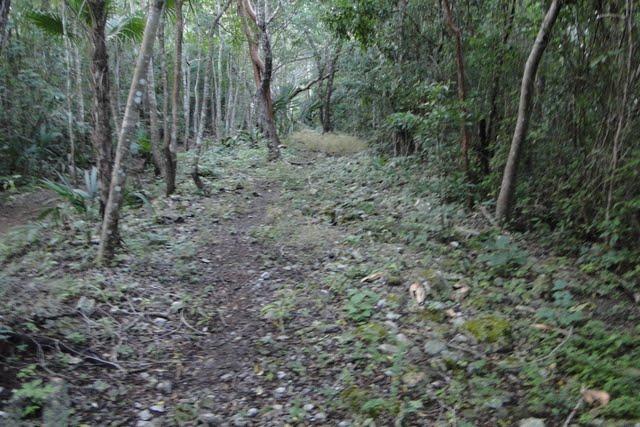
Ancient road

== See also ==
- Witschey, Walter R.T. (1993). The Archaeology of Muyil, Quintana Roo, Mexico: A Maya Site on the East Coast of the Yucatan Peninsula (Tulane University PhD dissertation ed.). Ann Arbor, MI: University Microfilms International. OCLC 30573269. UMI ID 9325992. Archived from the original (online reproduction by author) on 2012-03-23.
