= Quintana Roo =

State of Mexico

- State
- Free and Sovereign State of Quintana Roo; Estado Libre y Soberano de Quintana Roo (Spanish); Xóot' Noj Lu'umil Quintana Roo (Yucatec Maya)
- Flag Coat of arms
- Anthem: Himno a Quintana Roo
- Coordinates: 19°36′N 87°55′W
- Country: Mexico
- Capital: Chetumal
- Largest city: Cancún
- Municipalities: 11
- Before statehood: Territory of Quintana Roo
- Admission: October 8, 1974
- Order: 31st
- Named for: Andrés Quintana Roo

Government
  - Governor: Mara Lezama Espinosa
  - Parliament: Congress of Quintana Roo

Area
  - Total: 44,705.2 km^{2} (17,260.8 sq mi)
- Ranked 19th
- Highest elevation: 230 m (750 ft)

Population (2020)
  - Total: 1,857,985
  - Rank: 24th
  - Density: 41.5608/km^{2} (107.642/sq mi)
  - Rank: 24th
- Demonym: Quintanarroense

GDP (2022)
  - Total: MXN 447 billion (US$22.2 billion)
  - Per capita: US$11,479
- Time zone: UTC−05:00 (Zona Sureste)
- Postal code: 77
- Area code: Area codes: • 983; • 984; • 987; • 997; • 998
- ISO 3166 code: MX-ROO
- HDI: ▲0.790 high Ranked 15th of 32
- Website: www.qroo.gob.mx

Quintana Roo, (Note: /kɪnˌtɑːnə ˈroʊ(oʊ)/ kin-TAH-nə ROH(-oh); Spanish: [kĩn̪ˈt̪ana ˈro]) officially the Free and Sovereign State of Quintana Roo, (Note: Spanish: Estado Libre y Soberano de Quintana Roo) is one of the 31 states which, along with Mexico City, constitute the 32 federal entities of Mexico. It is divided into 11 municipalities, and its capital city is Chetumal.

Quintana Roo is located on the eastern part of the Yucatán Peninsula and is bordered by the states of Campeche to the west and Yucatán to the northwest, and by the Orange Walk and Corozal districts of Belize, along with an offshore borderline with Belize District to the south. As Mexico's easternmost state, Quintana Roo has a coastline to the east with the Caribbean Sea and to the north with the Gulf of Mexico. The state previously covered 44,705 square kilometers (17,261 sq mi) and shared a small border with Guatemala in the southwest of the state. However, in 2013, Mexico's Supreme Court of Justice of the Nation resolved the boundary dispute between Quintana Roo, Campeche, and Yucatán stemming from the creation of the Calakmul municipality by Campeche in 1997, siding with Campeche and thereby benefiting Yucatán.

Quintana Roo is home to the city of Cancún, the islands of Cozumel and Isla Mujeres, and the towns of Bacalar, Playa del Carmen and Akumal, as well as the ancient Maya ruins of Chacchoben, Cobá, Kohunlich, Muyil, Tulum, Xel-Há, San Gervasio and Xcaret. The Sian Ka'an biosphere reserve is also located in the state. The statewide population is expanding at a rapid rate due to the construction of hotels and the demand for workers. Many migrants come from Yucatán, Campeche, Tabasco, and Veracruz. The state is frequently hit by severe hurricanes due to its exposed location, among the most severe being Hurricane Dean in 2007, which made landfall with sustained winds of 280 km/h (170 mph), with gusts up to 320 km/h (200 mph).

== History ==
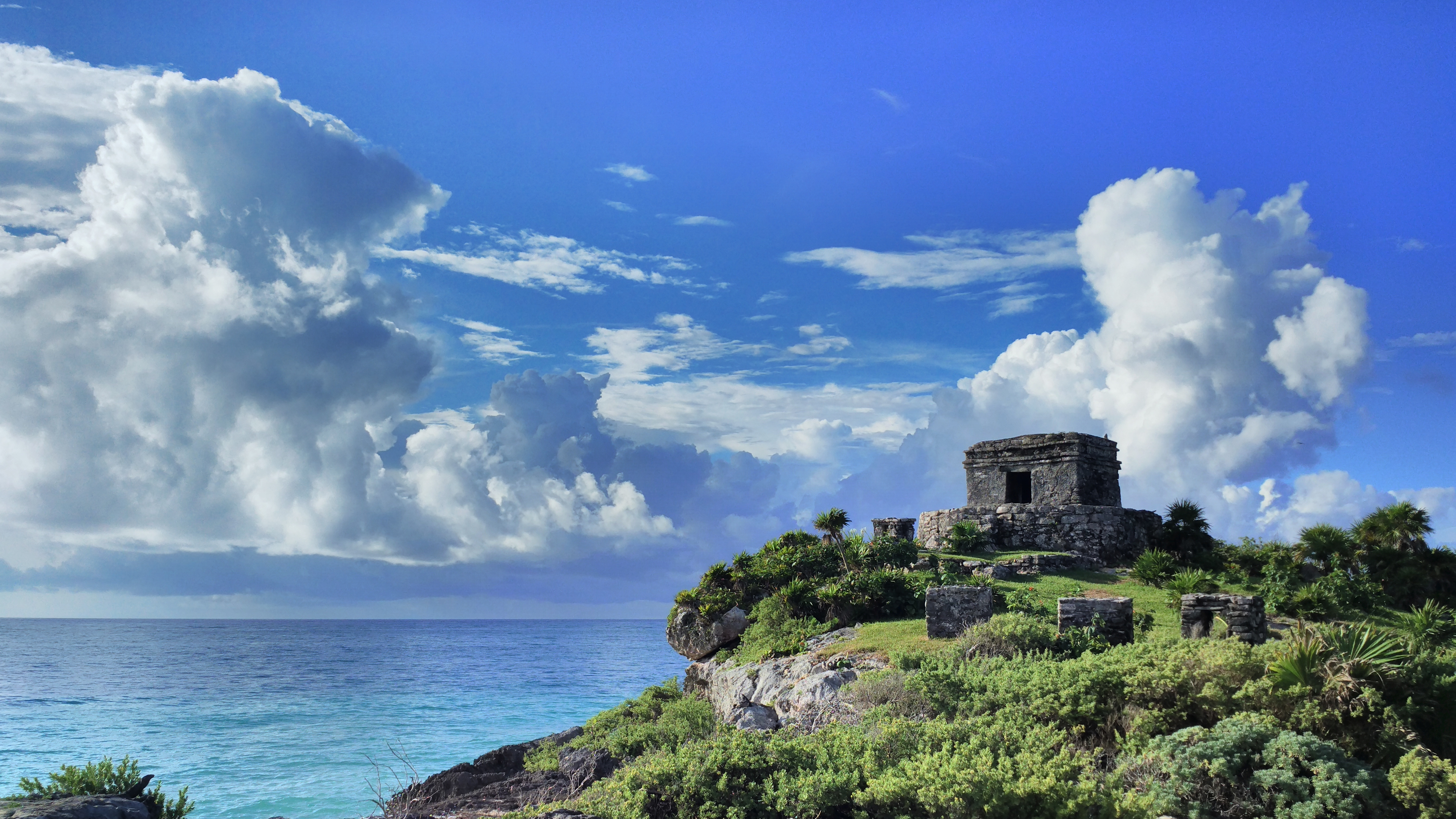
Temple of the Wind God, Tulum

The area that makes up present-day Quintana Roo was long part of Yucatán, sharing its history. Beginning around 2000 BC, the Mayans transformed the area that would become Quintana Roo into an agricultural forest. Selective management of forest trees was developed that has continued to shape the region's forests. Archaeological evidence also shows the presence of ancient home gardens, including managed tree plots and cacao groves.

Spanish colonization affected the region beginning in the 16th century. With the Caste War of Yucatán, which started in the 1840s, all non-Indigenous peoples were driven from the region. The independent Maya nation of Chan Santa Cruz was based on what is now the town of Felipe Carrillo Puerto. For decades, it maintained considerable independence, having separate trade and treaty relationships with British Honduras, now Belize.

The Territory of Quintana Roo was created by decree of President Porfirio Díaz on November 24, 1902. It was named after an early patriot of the Mexican Republic, Andrés Quintana Roo. The Mexican Federal Army succeeded in subjugating most of the indigenous Maya population of the region during the 1910s. In 1913, the area was again declared to be legally part of the state of Yucatán, but was again declared a separate territory in 1915. The territory of Quintana Roo was granted statehood within the United Mexican States on October 8, 1974.

In the last quarter of the 20th century and continuing into the 21st, Quintana Roo developed rapidly, with tourism being a driving force, notably with the development of Cancún. As a result of this development, the northern part of Quintana Roo has been increasingly touristified. By contrast, the south has continued with a traditional economy of forestry and wood extraction.

=== Archaeological findings ===
Ancient human remains have been discovered in a system of submerged caves and sinkholes in the Tulum area of Quintana Roo. To date, a total of nine skeletons have been found in these caves, including one of the oldest human skeletons found on the American continent. In 2016, underwater archaeological exploration of a cave known as Chan Hol found a skeleton of a female who lived in the region at least 9,900 years ago, during the Paleo-Indian period. Dating revealed that the skeleton was probably about 30 years old at the time of death. Three different scars on the skull of the woman showed that she was hit with something hard and her skull bones were broken. Her skull also had crater-like deformations and tissue deformities that appeared to be caused by a bacterial relative of syphilis.

According to study lead researcher Wolfgang Stinnesbeck, "It really looks as if this woman had a very hard time and an extremely unhappy end of her life. Obviously, this is speculative, but given the traumas and the pathological deformations on her skull, it appears a likely scenario that she may have been expelled from her group and was killed in the cave, or was left in the cave to die there".

The skeleton found by the 2016 exploration was 140 m (150 yd) away from a site where a previous expedition found human remains known as Chan Hol 2. Although archaeologists assumed the 2016 expedition had rediscovered Chan Hol 2, Stinnesbeck concluded that the two skeletons represent different individuals.

Due to their distinctive features, study co-researcher Samuel Rennie suggested the existence of at least two morphologically diverse groups of people living separately in Mexico during the transition from Pleistocene to Holocene.

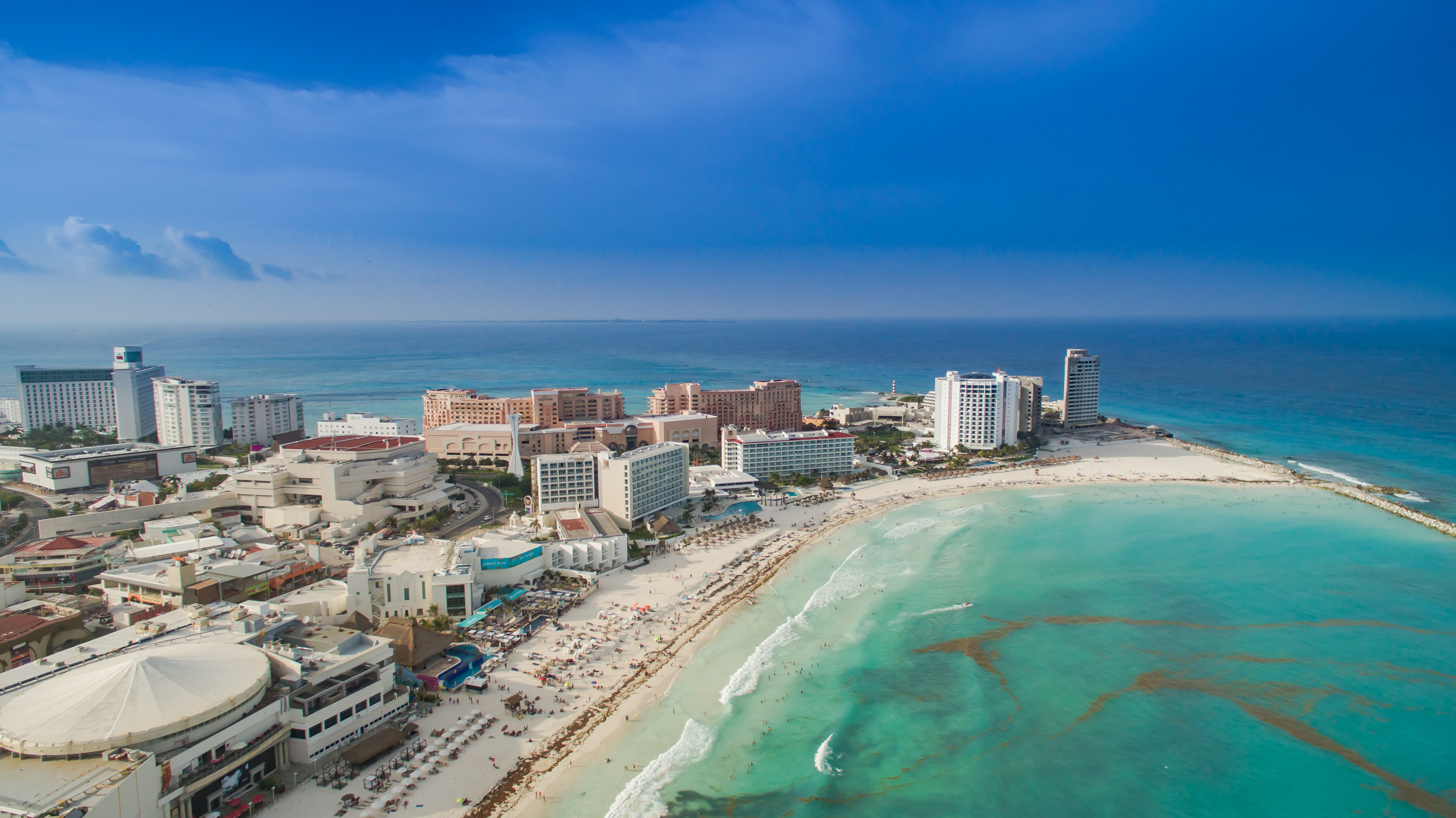
The city of Cancún is a major tourist resort in Quintana Roo, especially the Hotel Zone.

== Geography ==
=== Climate ===
According to the Köppen climate classification, much of the state has a tropical wet and dry climate (Aw) while the island of Cozumel has a tropical monsoon climate (Am). The mean annual temperature is 26 °C (78.8 °F). The hottest months are April and August, in which the average high is 33 °C (91.4 °F), while January is the coldest month with an average low of 17 °C (62.6 °F). Extreme temperatures can range from a low of 10 °C (50.0 °F) in the coldest months to 36 °C (96.8 °F) in the hottest months. Quintana Roo averages 1,300 mm (51 in) of precipitation per year, which falls throughout the year, though June to October are the wetter months. Hurricanes can occasionally hit the coastal areas during the hurricane season, particularly from September to November. 2020 was a historic year for hurricanes in Quintana Roo, with a record-breaking 31 tropical systems formed, of which four affected the state.

=== Wildlife ===
Flora and fauna of Quintana Roo
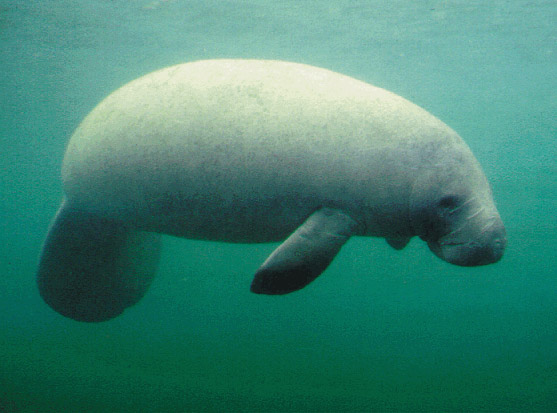
Trichechus manatus

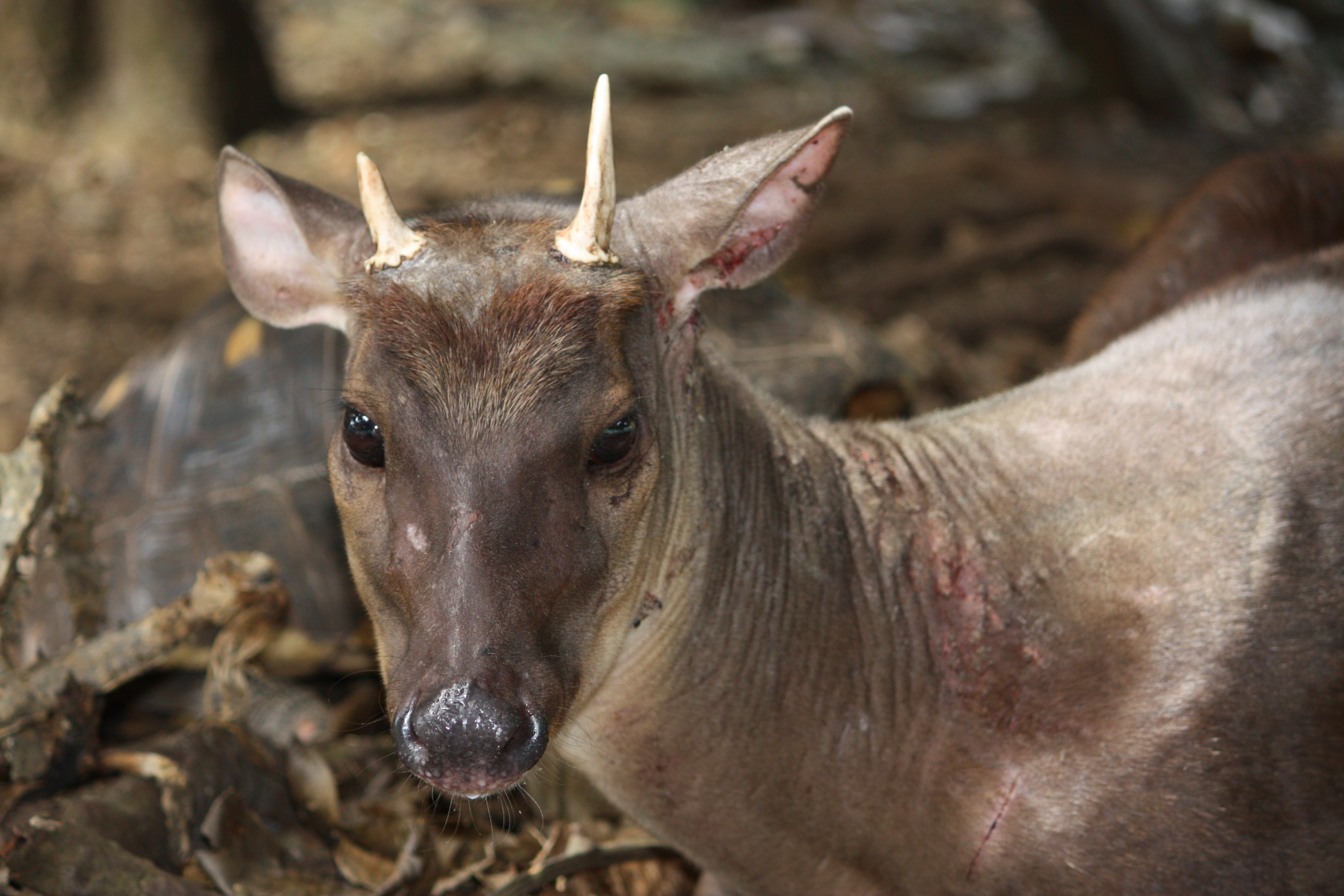
Mazama pandora

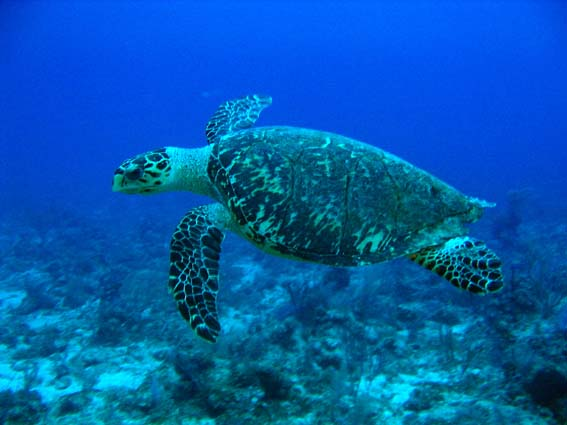
Eretmochelys imbricata

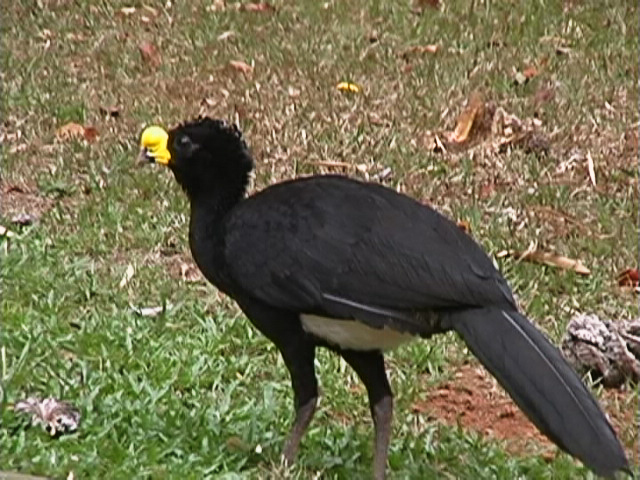
Crax rubra

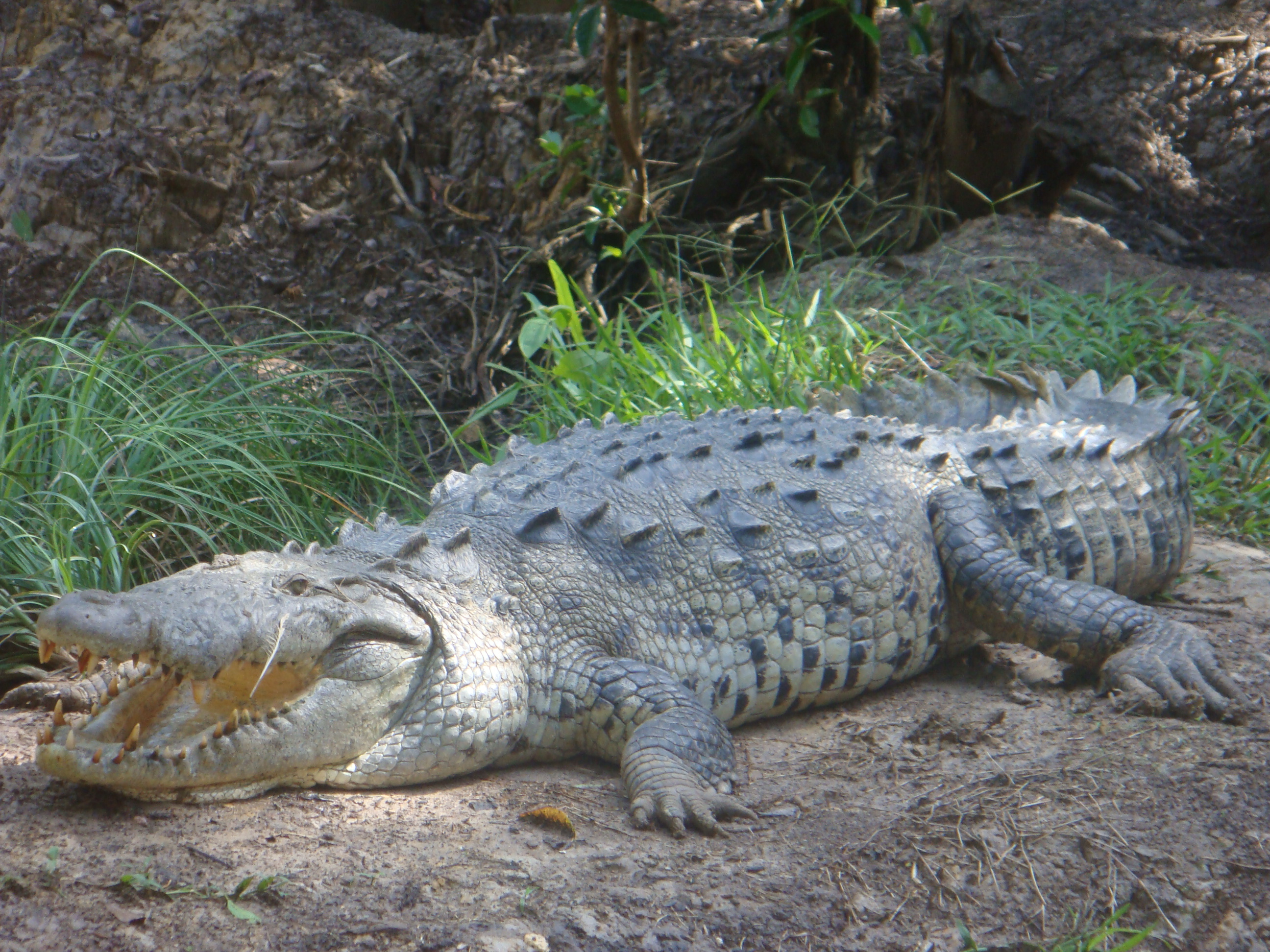
Crocodylus acutus

Ateles geoffroyi

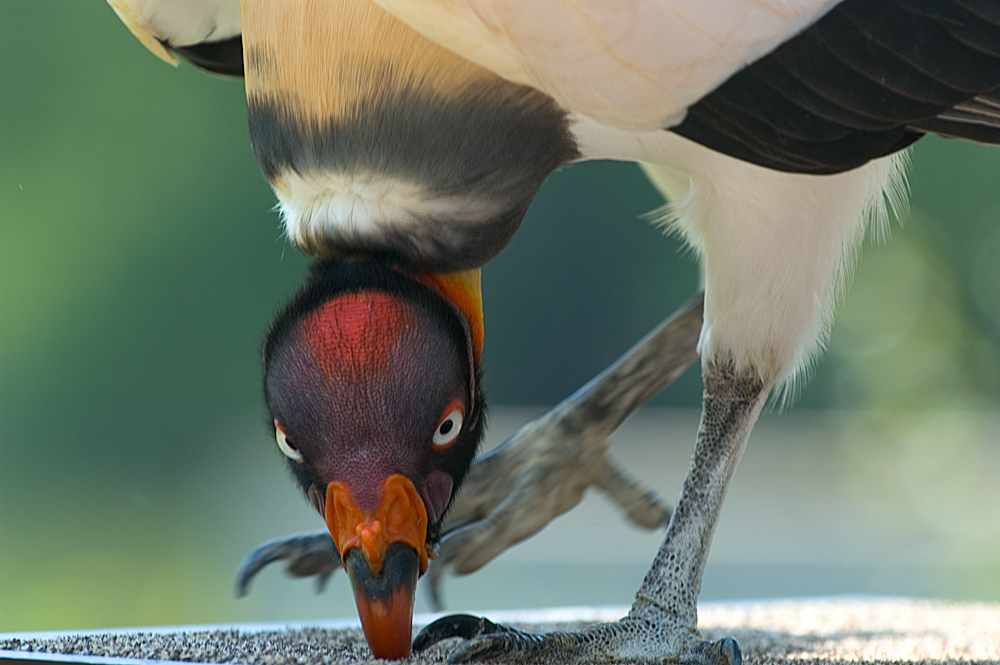
Sarcoramphus papa

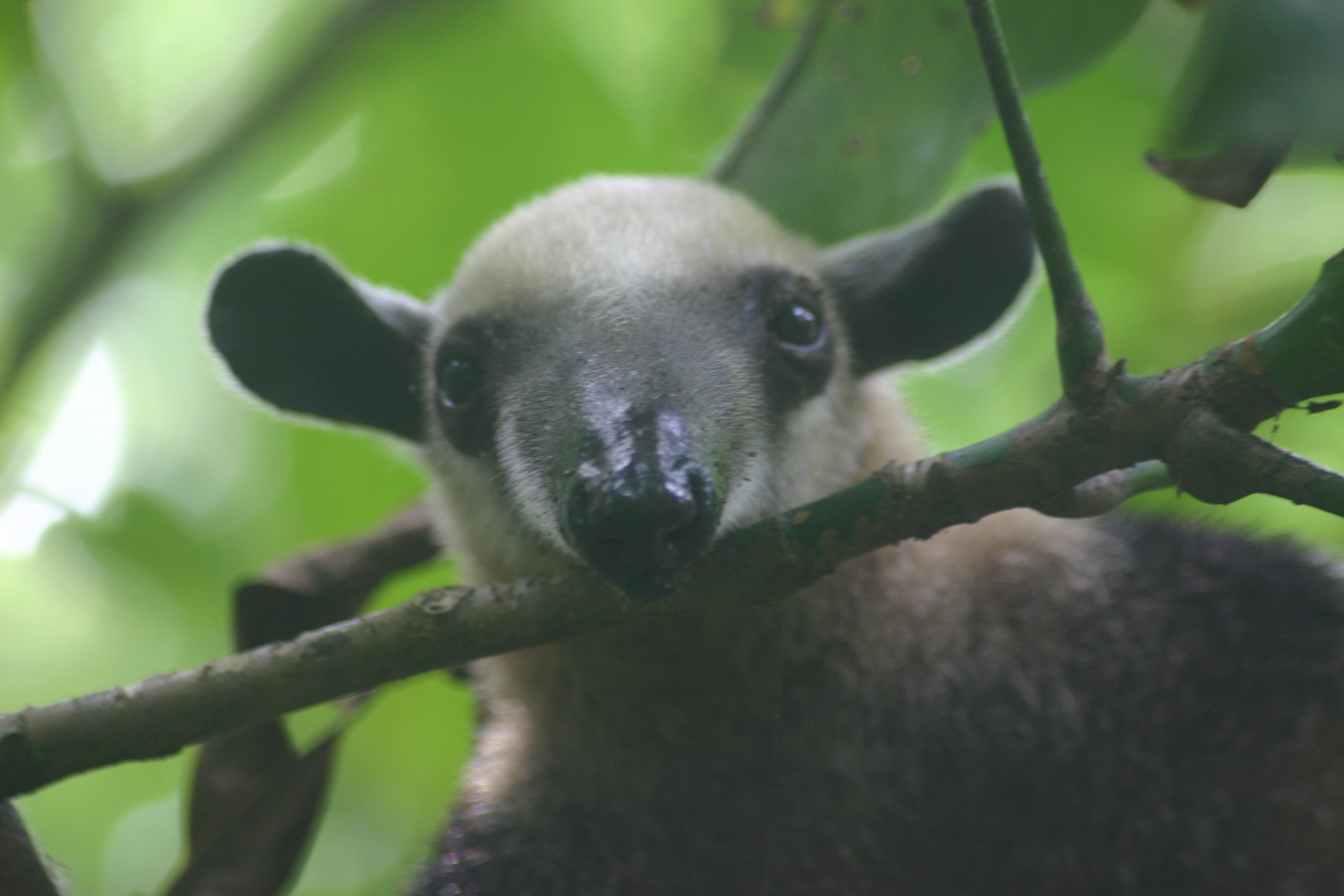
Tamandua mexicana

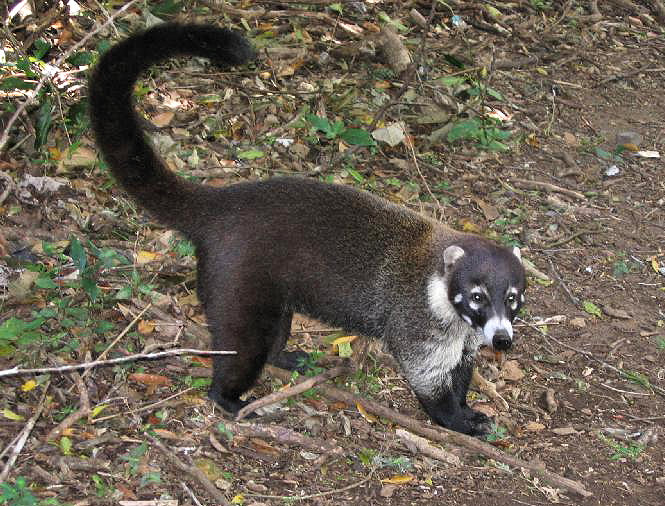
Nasua narica

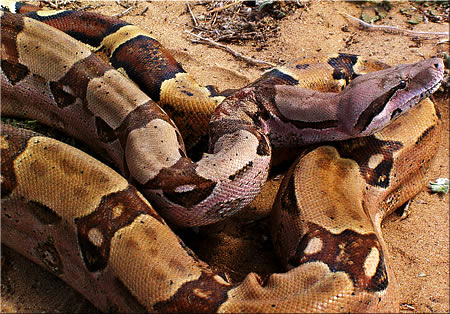
Boa constrictor

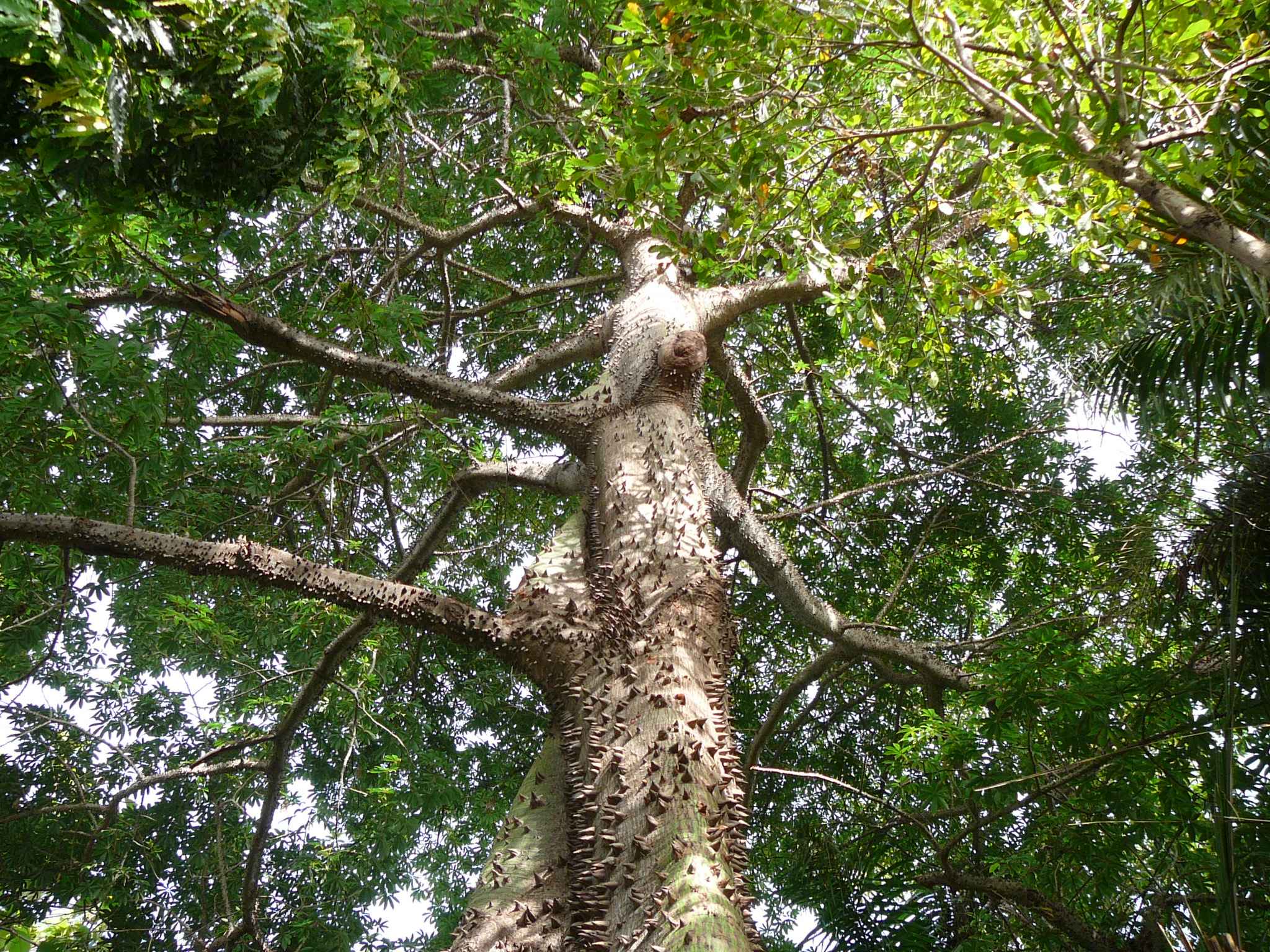
Ceiba pentandra

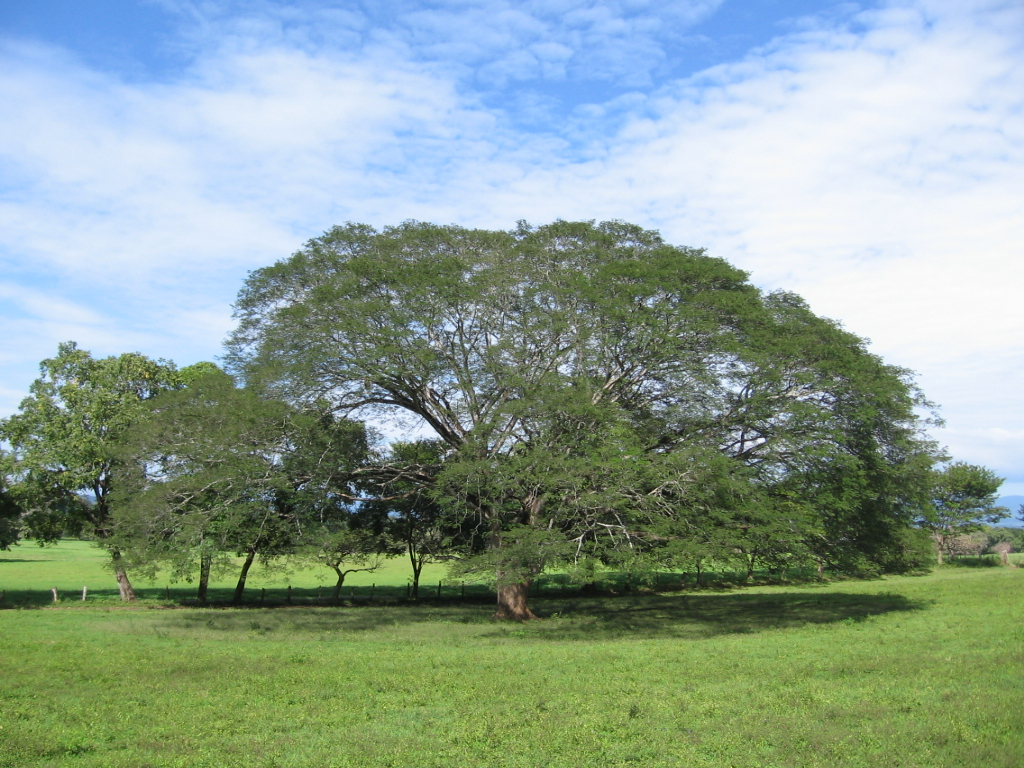
Enterolobium cyclocarpum

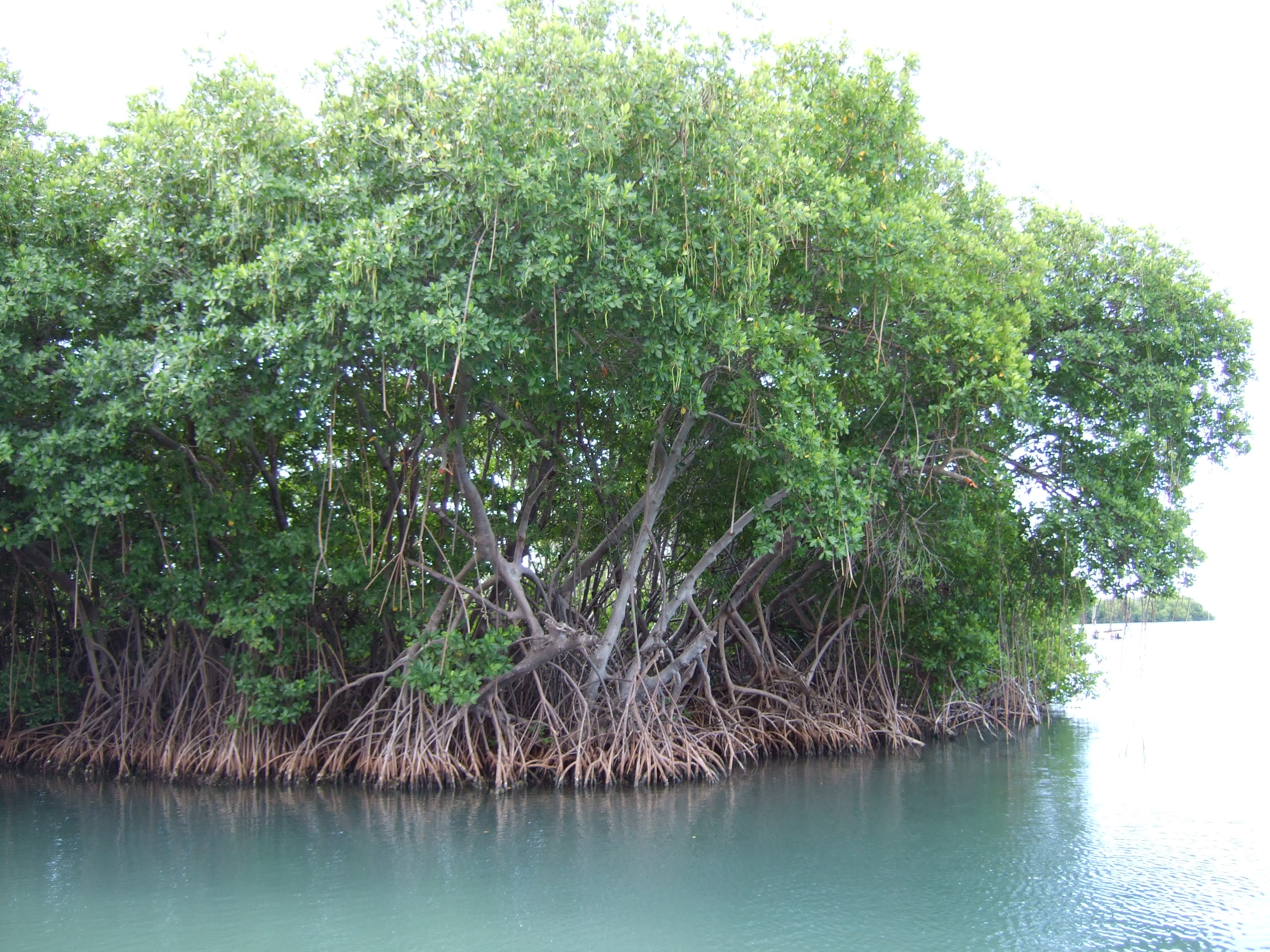
Rhizophora mangle

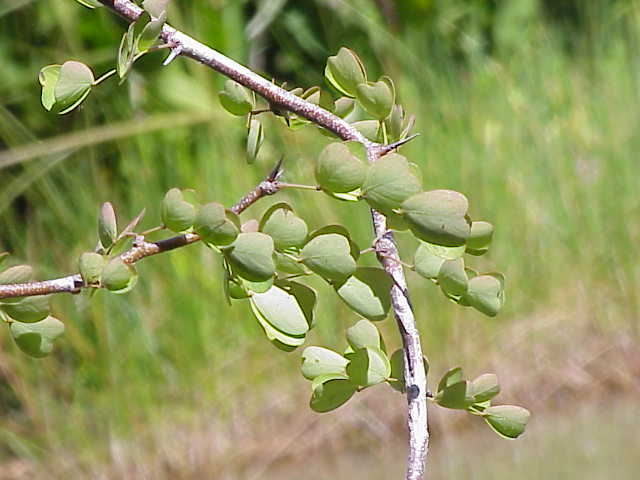
Haematoxylum campechianum

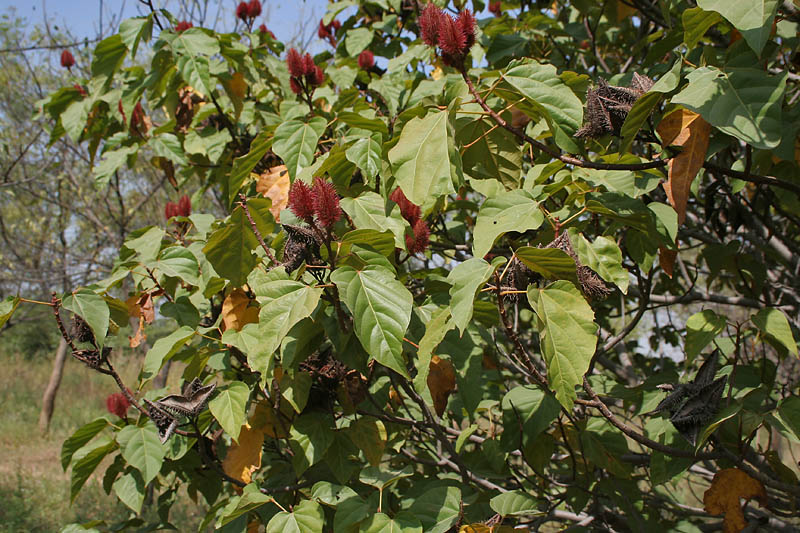
Bixa orellana

=== Conservation ===
The Yucatán Peninsula is one of the most forested areas of the world in terms of biotic mass per hectare. However, anthropological, biological and governmental experts have determined that Quintana Roo is 'facing a faunal crisis'. Many medium to large game animals are disappearing due to hunting and habitat loss. While its population is relatively small, Quintana Roo is experiencing both a population influx and an increase in tourism. This only increases the pressure on the plants and animals native to the area.

From 1996 to 2003, the USAID-supported programme Conserving Critical Coastal Ecosystems in Mexico operated in the southern portion of Quintana Roo with partners including Conservation International Mexico, combining site-based coastal management initiatives with policy and planning work for tourism and shoreline use in the Costa Maya region (including work in Xcalak and Chetumal Bay).

=== Ecosystems and animals ===
There are four generalized ecosystems in Quintana Roo—tropical forests, or jungle; savanna, mangrove forests, and coral reefs. One of the byproducts of traditional and large-scale agriculture is the creation of additional habitats, such as second growth forests and fields/pastures. Tourism has caused Quintana Roo to become famous around the world in the last thirty or so years for its beaches, coastline, and cenote sinkholes. Biological experts consider the coastline of Quintana Roo one of the best manatee habitats worldwide. Queen conchs are also noted for their inhabitation of coastal territory. The wide variety of biotic organisms such as these has decreased drastically in the last fifteen years.

=== Birds ===
Also affected by the loss of habitat due to both agriculture and development, birds are one of the region's most varied animal assets. Hundreds of species reside in Quintana Roo permanently, with hundreds of others either wintering there or using it as a stopover on the long journey into South America. As a result, many birders come to the area annually in search of the rare and unexpected.

== Demographics ==
Historical population
Year	Pop.	±%
1895		—
1900		—
1910	9,109	—
1921	10,966	+20.4%
1930	10,620	−3.2%
1940	18,752	+76.6%
1950	26,967	+43.8%
1960	50,169	+86.0%
1970	88,150	+75.7%
1980	225,985	+156.4%
1990	493,277	+118.3%
1995	703,536	+42.6%
2000	874,963	+24.4%
2005	1,135,309	+29.8%
2010	1,325,578	+16.8%
2015	1,501,562	+13.3%
2020	1,857,985	+23.7%

Largest cities or towns in Quintana Roo Source:
Rank		Municipality	Pop.
1	Cancún	Benito Juárez	888,797
2	Playa del Carmen	Solidaridad	304,942
3	Chetumal	Othón P. Blanco	169,028
4	San Miguel de Cozumel	Cozumel	84,519
5	Tulum	Tulum	33,374
6	Felipe Carrillo Puerto	Felipe Carrillo Puerto	30,754
7	Puerto Aventuras	Solidaridad	22,878
8	Alfredo V. Bonfil	Benito Juárez	19,789
9	Puerto Morelos	Puerto Morelos	19,205
10	Jose María Morelos	Jose María Morelos	13,332

== Municipalities ==
The State of Quintana Roo is divided into 11 municipalities (Spanish: municipios), each headed by a municipal president:

- Bacalar
- Benito Juárez
- Othón P. Blanco
- Puerto Morelos
- Cozumel
- Felipe Carrillo Puerto
- Isla Mujeres
- Solidaridad
- Tulum
- José María Morelos
- Lázaro Cárdenas

== Tourism ==
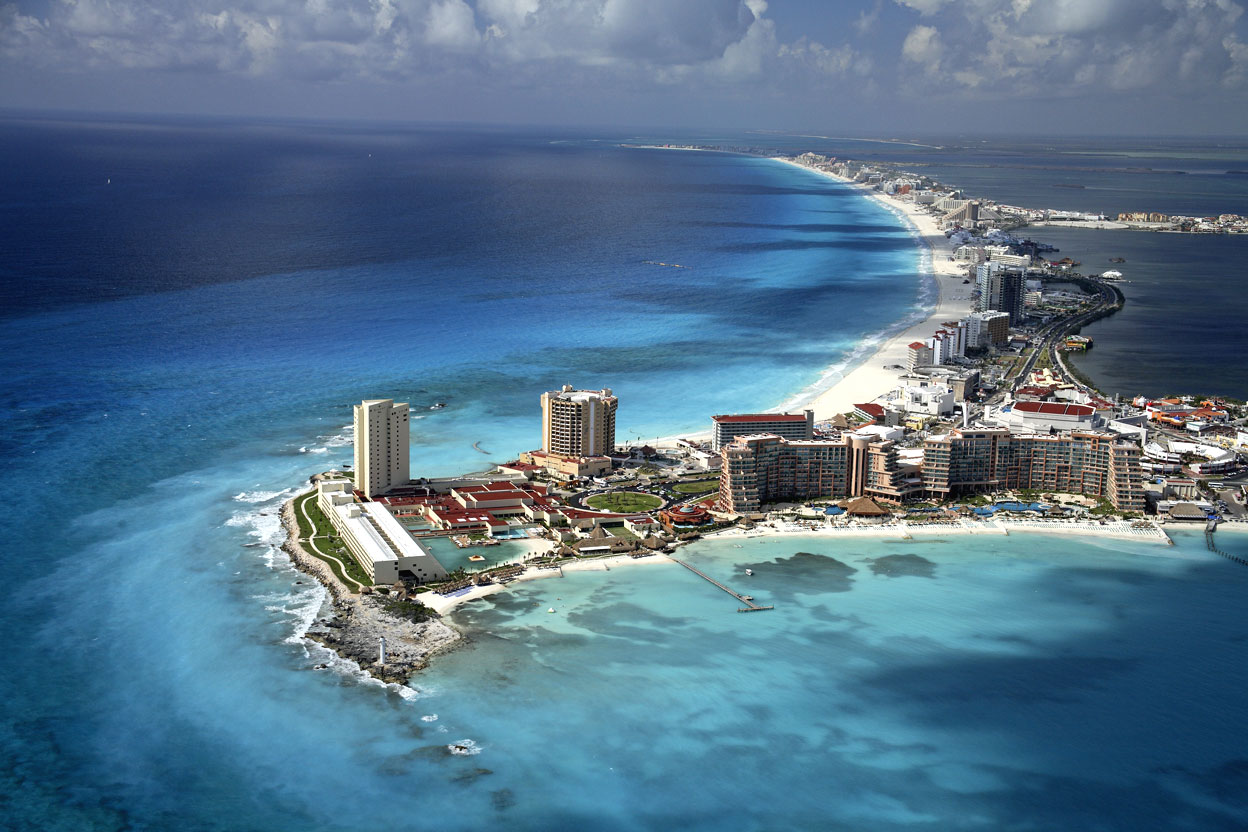
Aerial view of Cancún's Hotel Zone

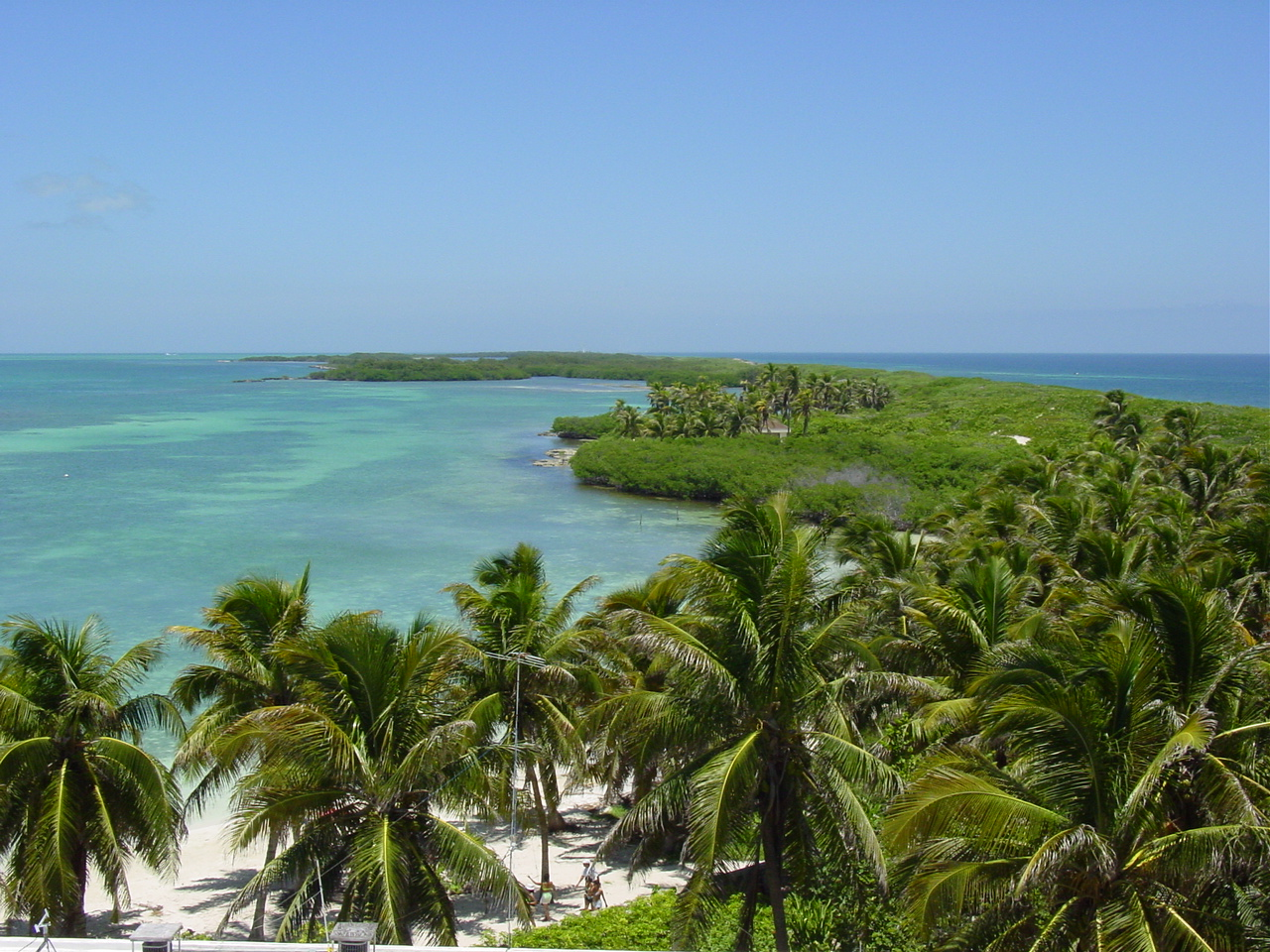
Beach of Contoy Island

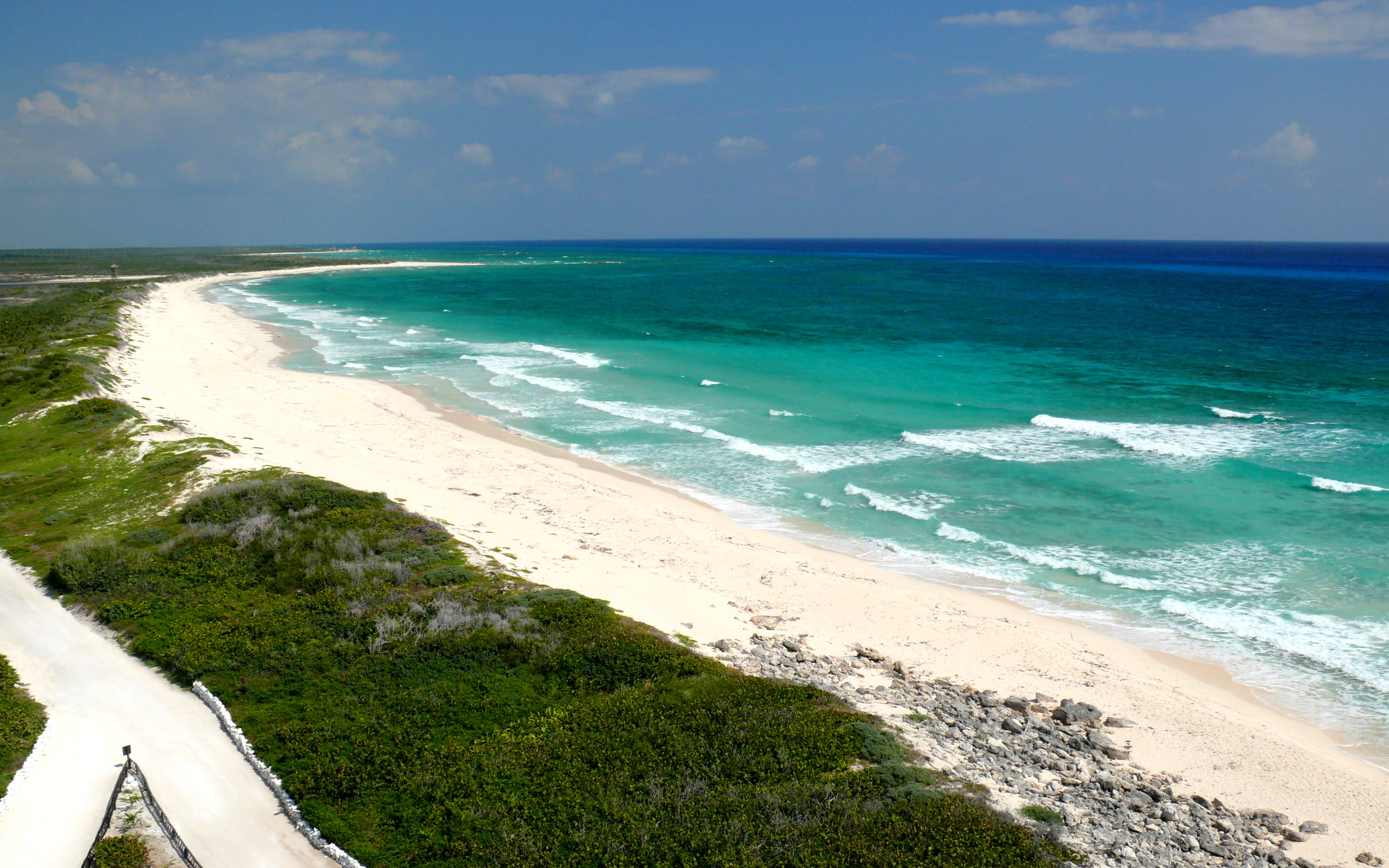
Beach of Punta Sur at south at the Cozumel Island

Quintana Roo's tourist boom began in the 1970s. Tourism resulted in the development of coastal hotels and resorts, in addition to ecotourism inland and in coastal regions, which have increased the development of the region as well as the gross domestic product. Quintana Roo ranks sixth among Mexican states according to the United Nations Human Development index (HDI).

The Riviera Maya is located along the Caribbean coastline, including Cancún, Playa del Carmen, Puerto Morelos, Akumal, the Hotel Zone, and Cozumel.

There are a number of Mayan archeological sites in Quintana Roo, including Chacchoben, Coba, Kohunlich, Muyil, San Gervasio, Tulum, Xcaret, Xelha, and Yo'okop.

Projections for the tourism economy of Quintana Roo have been optimistic, based on multiple attractions, from the Maya ruins to the lush forests and beautiful beaches. However, long-term problems include the effect on the local environment, economic stresses of development and population, and "economic marginalization" of the Maya natives.

== Education ==
=== Universities ===
- Instituto Tecnológico de Cancún, Cancún
- Instituto Tecnológico de Chetumal, Chetumal
- University of Quintana Roo, Chetumal
- Intercultural Maya University of Quintana Roo, José María Morelos
- Universidad Anáhuac Cancún, Cancún
- Universidad del Caribe, Cancún
- Universidad Tecnológica de la Riviera Maya, Playa del Carmen
- Universidad La Salle Cancún, Cancún
- Universidad TecMilenio, Cancún

== Media ==
Newspapers of Quintana Roo include: Diario de Quintana Roo, Diario Respuesta, El Periódico de Quintana Roo, El Quintanarroense, Novedades de Quintana Roo, and Por Esto!

== Sports ==
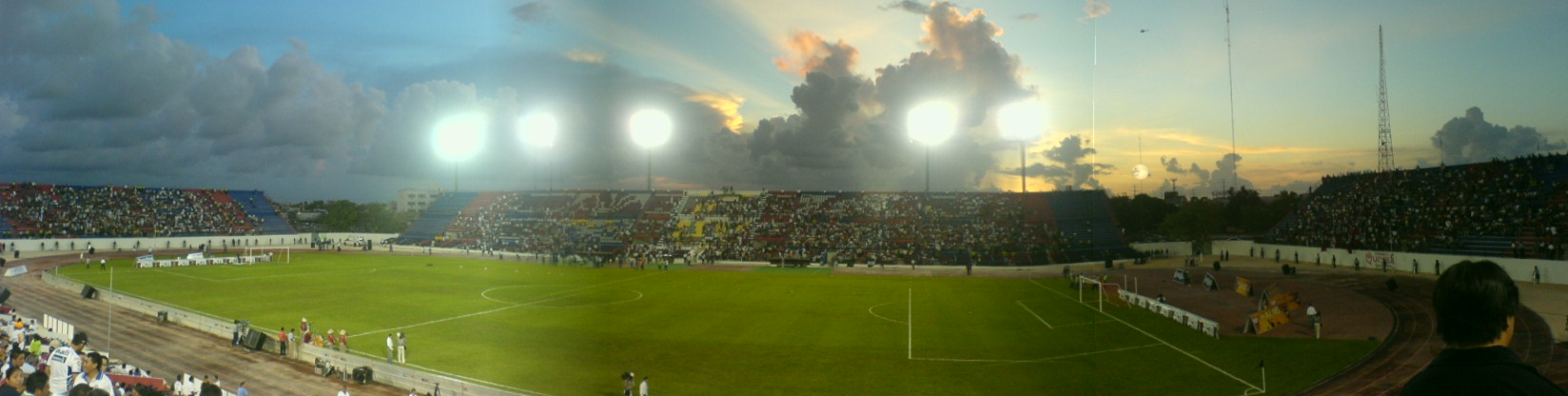
Estadio Andrés Quintana Roo in Cancún

Soccer club Atlante F.C. was founded in 1916 in Mexico City and moved to Cancun in 2007 due to poor attendance. The club announced a return to Mexico City in 2020, concurrently with the relocation of Cafetaleros de Chiapas to Cancún and its rebranding as Cancún F.C. They play in the Mexican second division Liga de Expansión MX at Estadio Andrés Quintana Roo.

In addition to soccer, the city has a professional baseball team, the Quintana Roo Tigers, which began playing at the Estadio de Béisbol Beto Ávila in Cancún in the 2006 season. The Tigers made it to the Mexican League series (analogous to MLB's World Series) in 2009, but lost to the Saraperos de Saltillo 4 games to 2.

== Time zone ==
On February 1, 2015, Quintana Roo officially adopted a new time zone, Southeastern, which is five hours behind Coordinated Universal Time (UTC−05:00). Quintana Roo does not observe daylight saving time, so Southeastern Time is constant throughout the year. Southeastern Time (ST) is the same as Eastern Standard Time (EST) and Central Daylight Time (CDT). This means that in the winter, Quintana Roo has the same time as regions observing EST, such as the eastern U.S., eastern Canada, Cuba, and Jamaica; and in the summer, Quintana Roo has the same time as regions observing CDT, such as central Mexico.

Quintana Roo changed to Southeastern Time for economic reasons, including:

- Allowing tourists in areas such as Cancún, Cozumel, and Playa del Carmen to spend more time (and money) at beaches, restaurants, historic sites, and other venues.
- Reducing electricity usage by hotels, restaurants, and other facilities.

Before Quintana Roo adopted the Southeastern time zone (officially referred to as zona sureste in Mexico), it had been part of the Central time zone (zona centro).

== Notable people ==
- Julián Abitia - governor Baja California Sur and Quintana Roo

== See also ==
- Cenote
