= Kohunlich =

Archaeological site in Quintana Roo, Mexico

Coordinates: 18°25′09″N 88°47′24″W

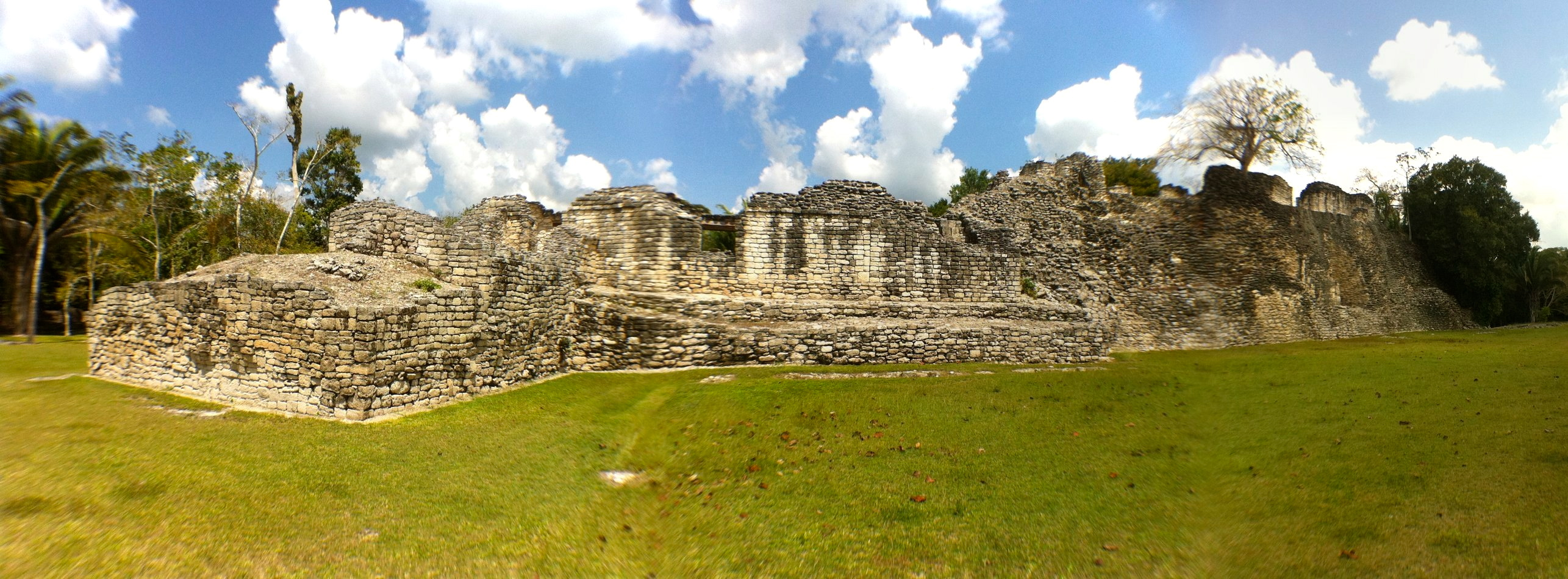
One of the sights at Kohunlich

Kohunlich (X-làabch'e'en in Modern Mayan) is a large archaeological site of the pre-Columbian Maya civilization, located on the Yucatán Peninsula in the state of Quintana Roo about 25 km east of the Rio Bec region, and about 65 km west of Chetumal on Highway 186, and 9 km south of the road.

The original name of the site is unknown. The actual Spanish name does not derive from Mayan but from the English Cohune Ridge where cohune palm grew. In 1912 this place was known as Clarksville, referring to the nearby logging camp that was 3 kilometers north of the site.

== Background ==
The site covers about 21 acres (85,000 m^{2}), surrounded by dense sub-tropical rainforest, and it contains almost 200 mounds, that remain largely unexcavated. The city was elaborately planned and engineered, with raised platforms and pyramids, citadels, courtyards and plazas surrounded with palace platforms, all laid out to channel drainage into a system of cisterns and an enormous reservoir to collect rainwater.

The site was settled by 200 BC, but most of the structures were built in the Early Classic period from about 250 to 600 AD. Many of them are still covered with thick vegetation and overgrown by trees. The city appears to have functioned as a regional center and stop along the trade routes through the southern Yucatán from Campeche and Rio Bec area to the west, and the cities along the east-coast and to the south, in the el Petén region of Guatemala and neighbouring Belize.

The site is best known for its Temple of the Masks, an Early Classic pyramid whose central stairway is flanked by huge humanized stucco masks. The Temple was built around 500 A.D. and is one of the oldest structures at Kohunlich. After 700 A.D., this temple was covered over with a Terminal Classic construction, which protected the masks and accounts for the marvelous state of their preservation today. The only standing remains of the later temple are some steps in the lower portion of the stair.

The road approaches the site from the north and leads into an enormous central plaza ringed by pyramids and temple platforms. To the north there is a massive, raised acropolis, or citadel, with a palace complex around a courtyard to the north-west. Further east there is the Temple of the Masks, built in honor of the sungod. Originally there were eight carved masks flanking its central staircase; only five remain, three having been looted.

== Gallery ==
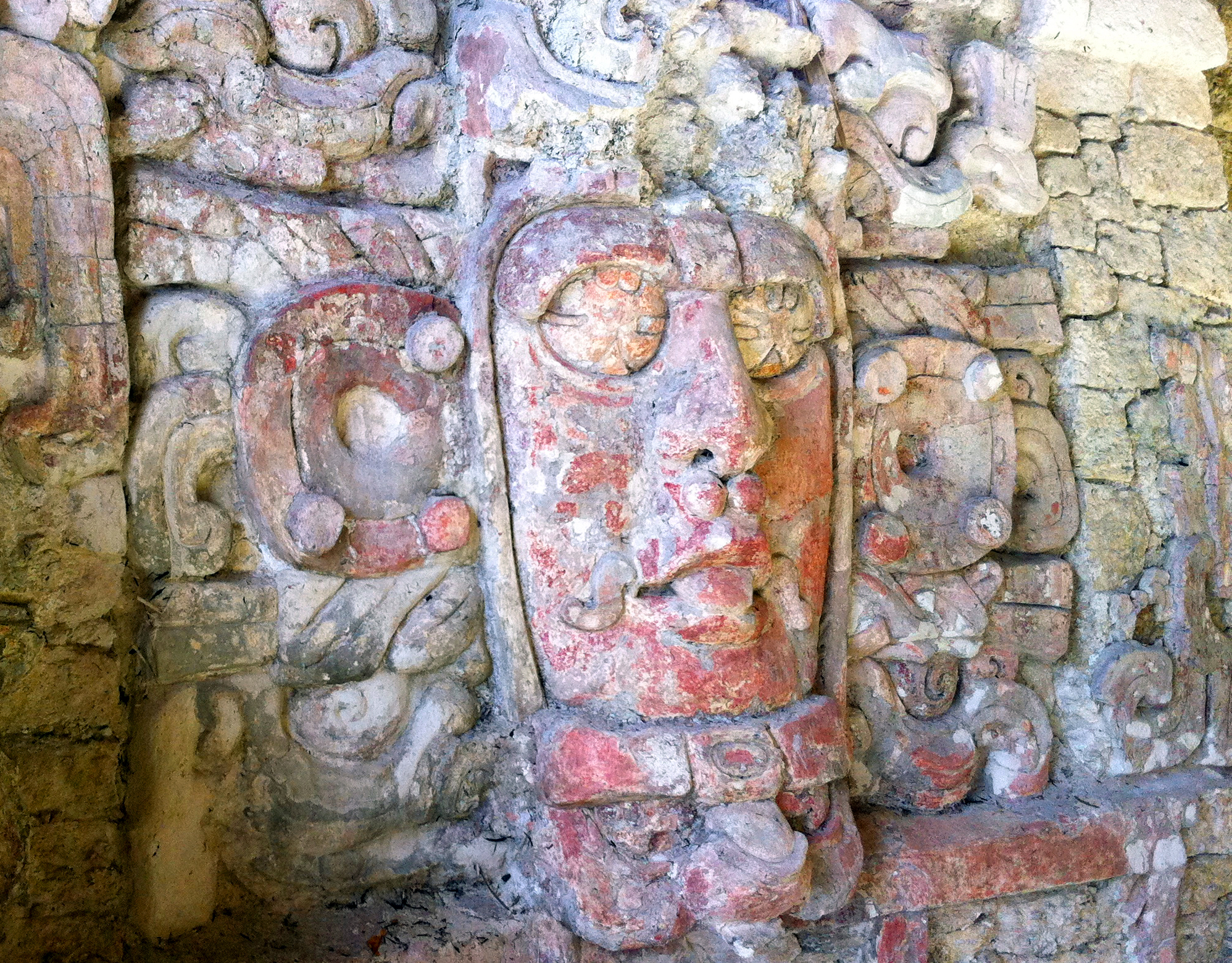
a closeup of one of the masks

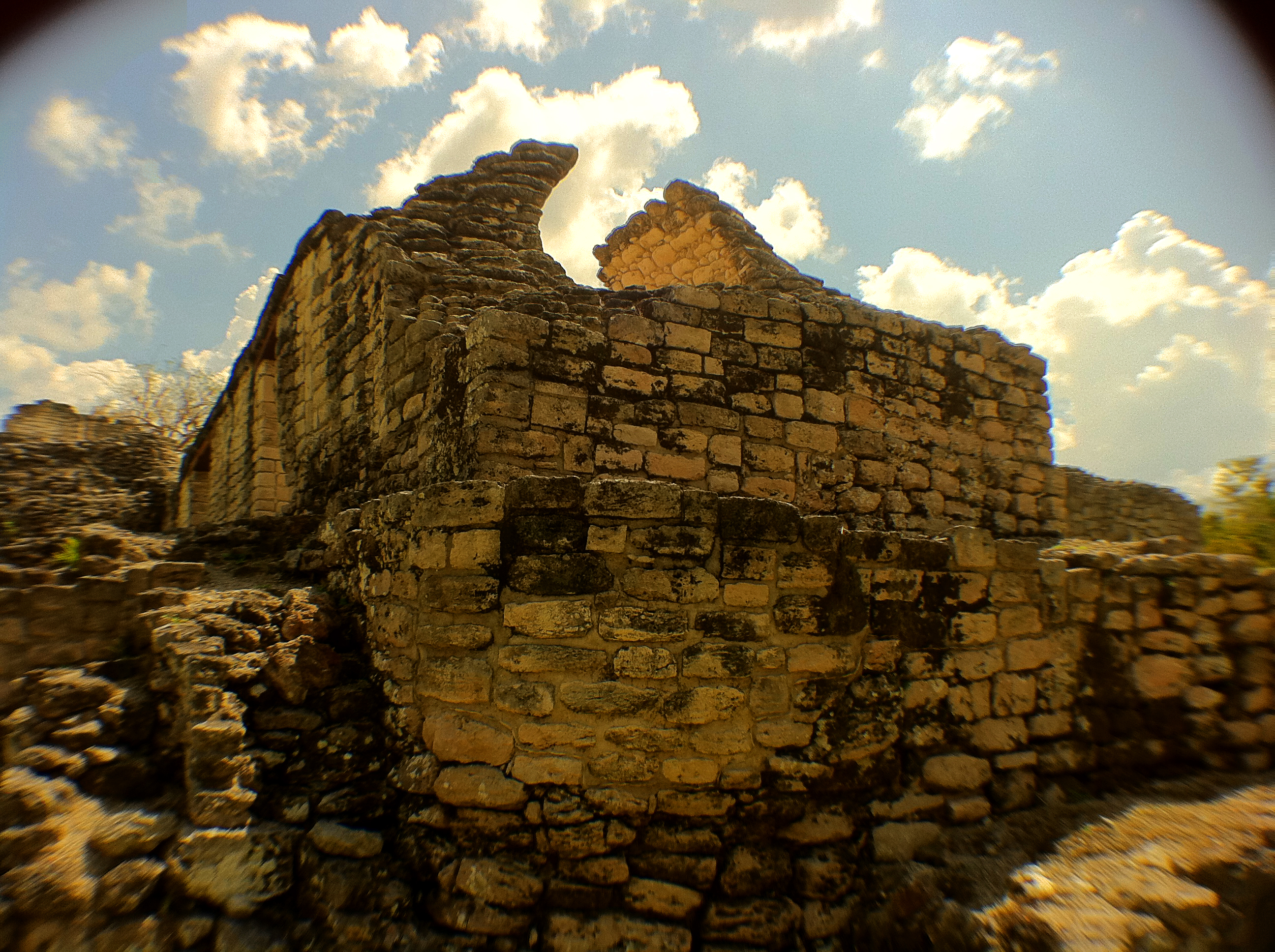

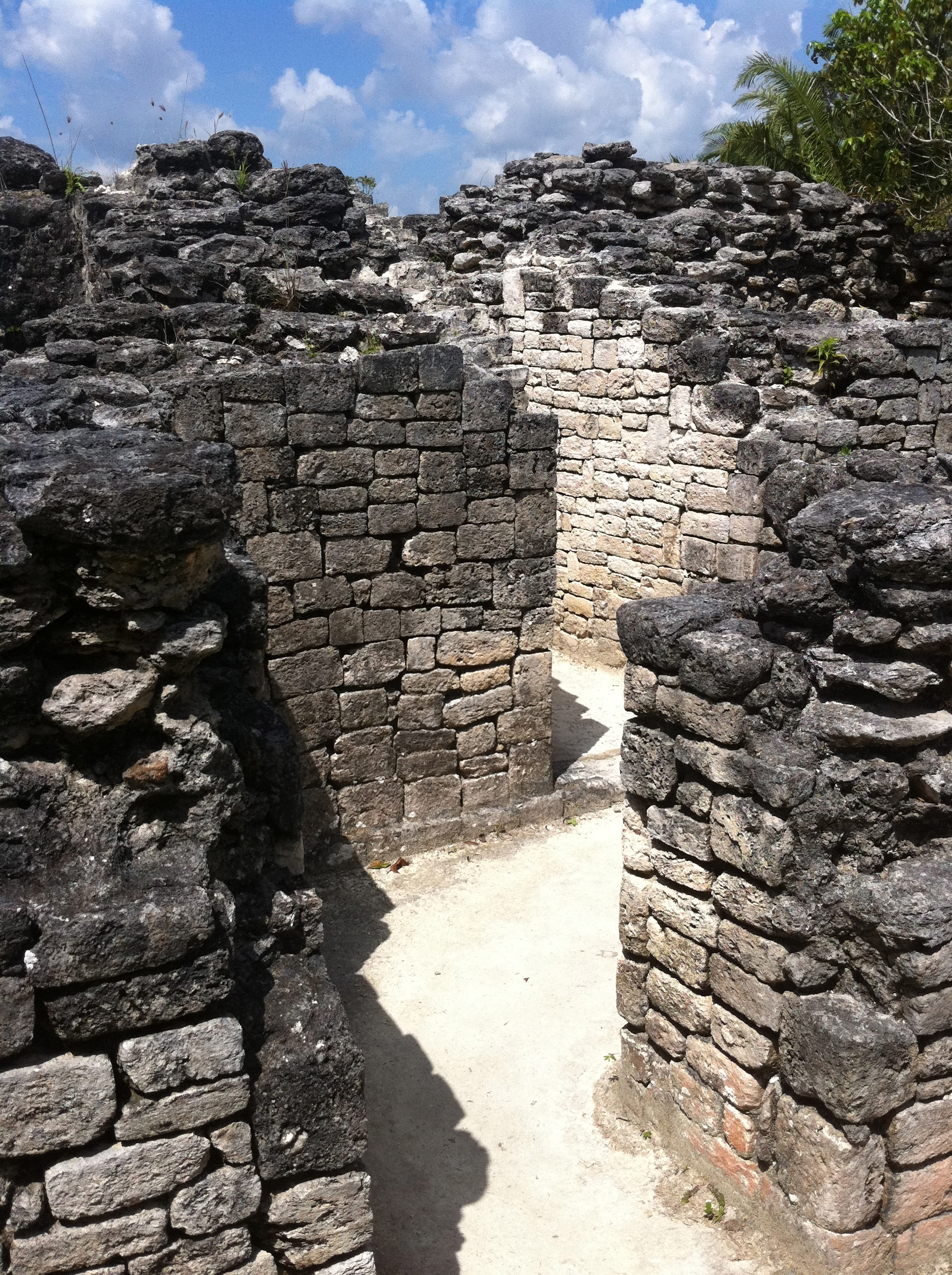
entrance to one of the upper class homes

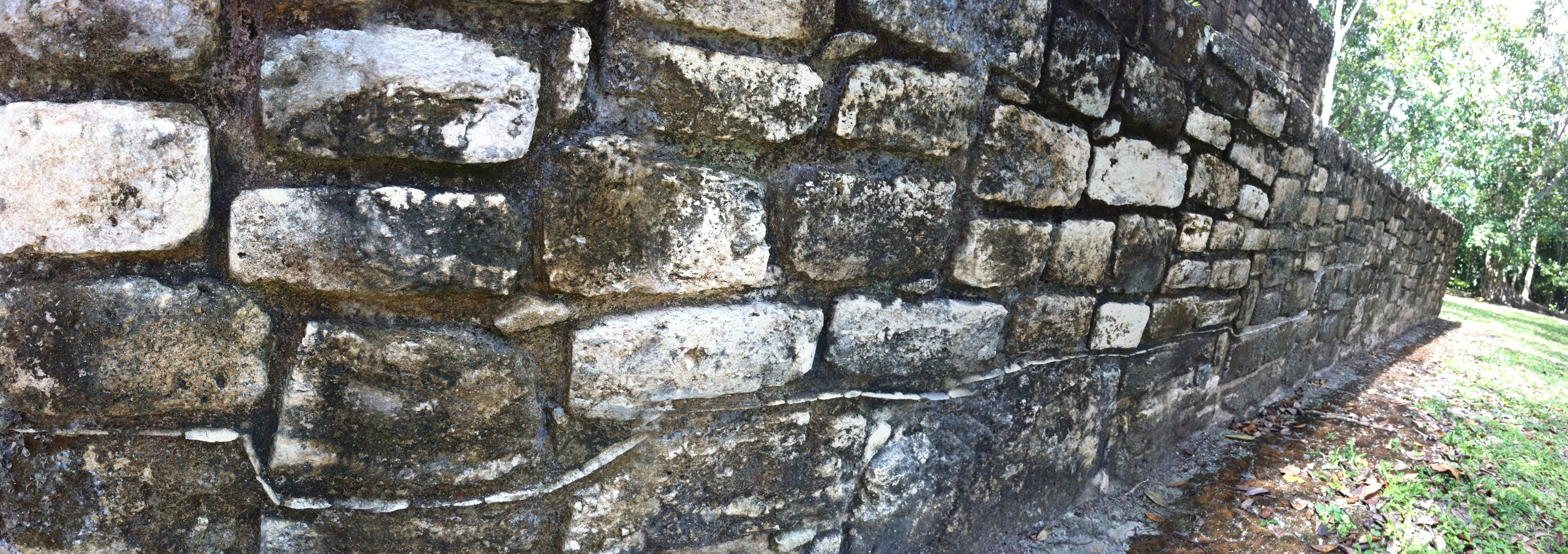
a restoration line indicating where fallen stones had to be replaced

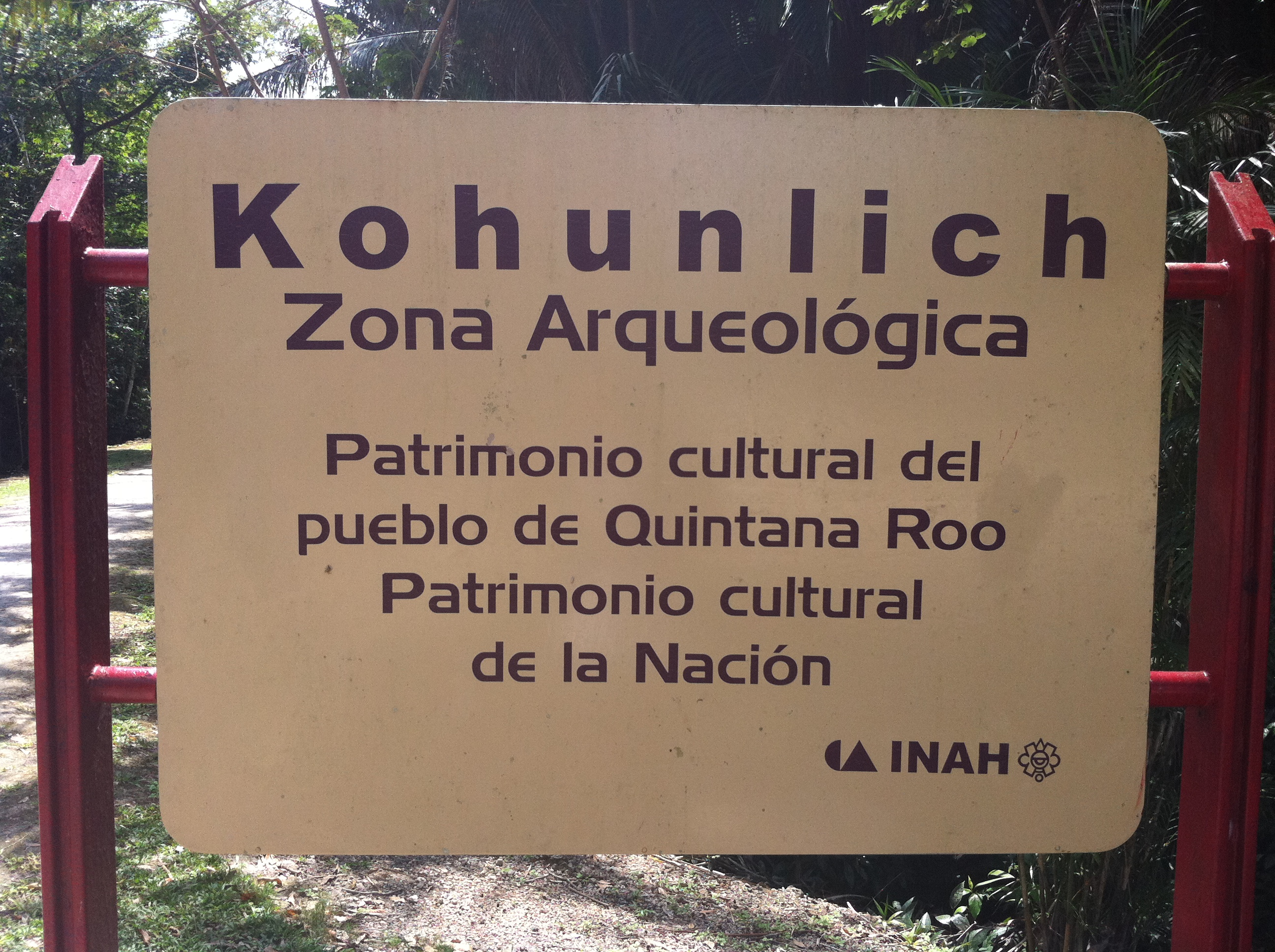
"Kohunlich Archaeological Zone: Cultural Heritage of the People of Quintana Roo Cultural Heritage of the Nation"

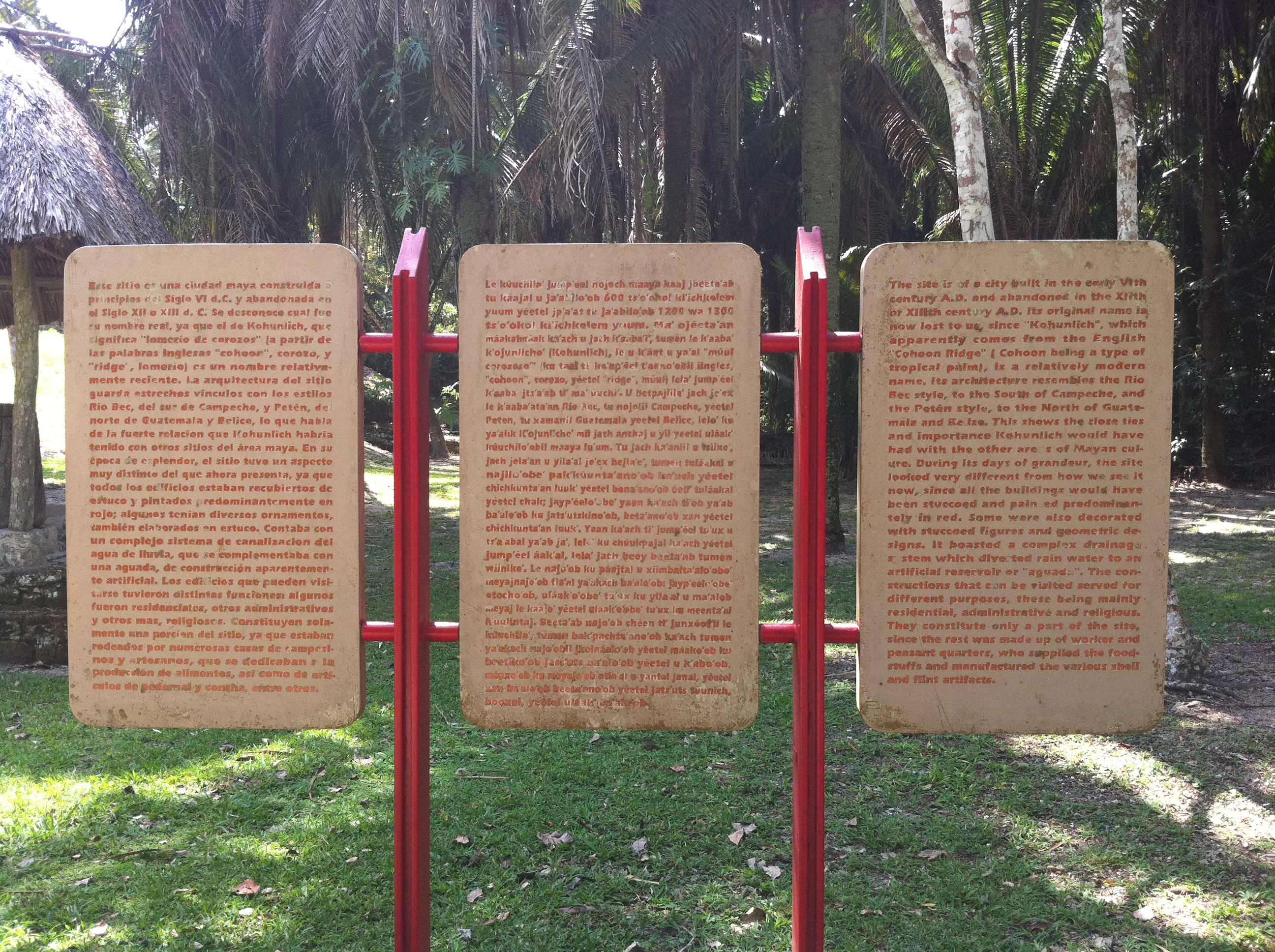
Sign from the Mexican National Institute of Anthropology and History

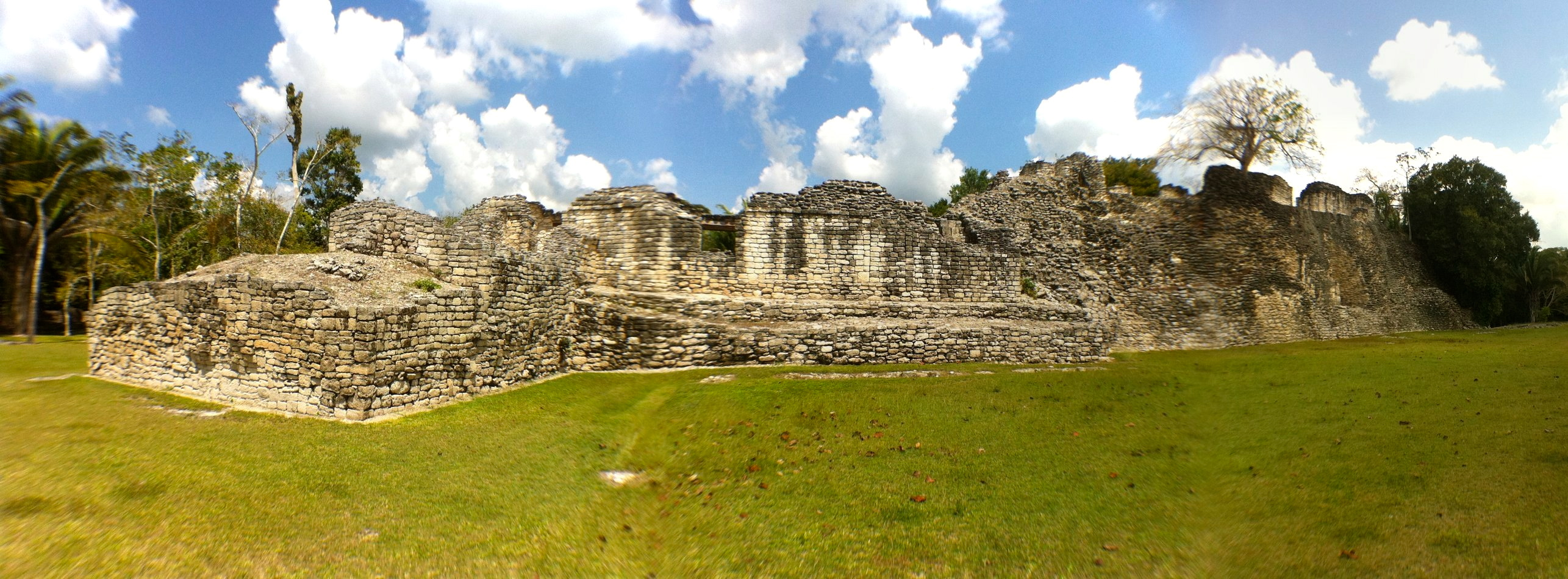

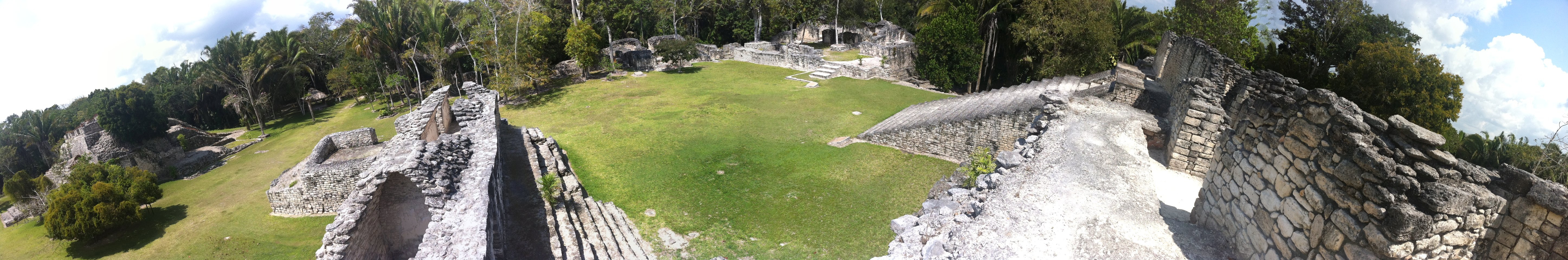

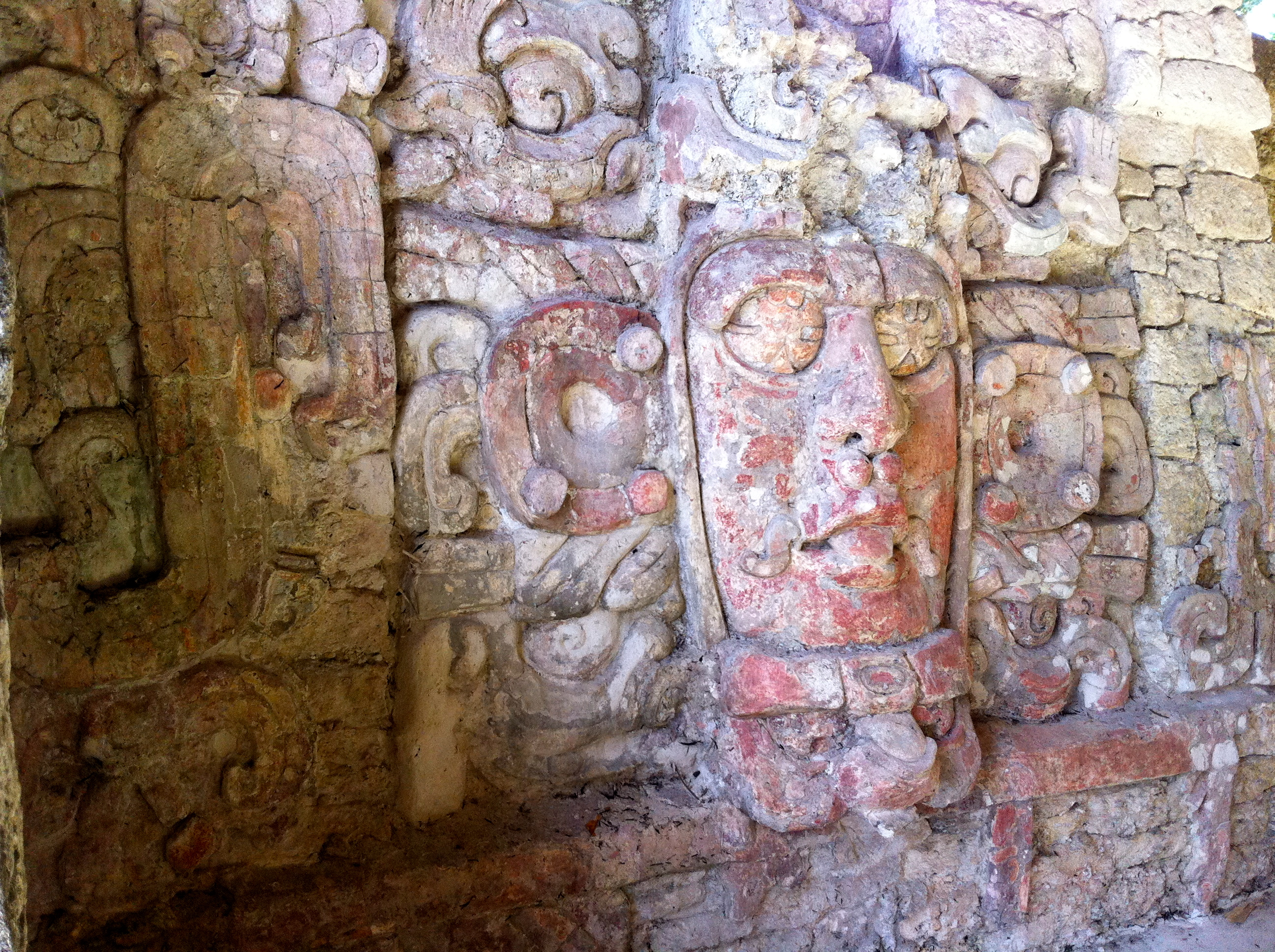
mask with cochineal red pigment

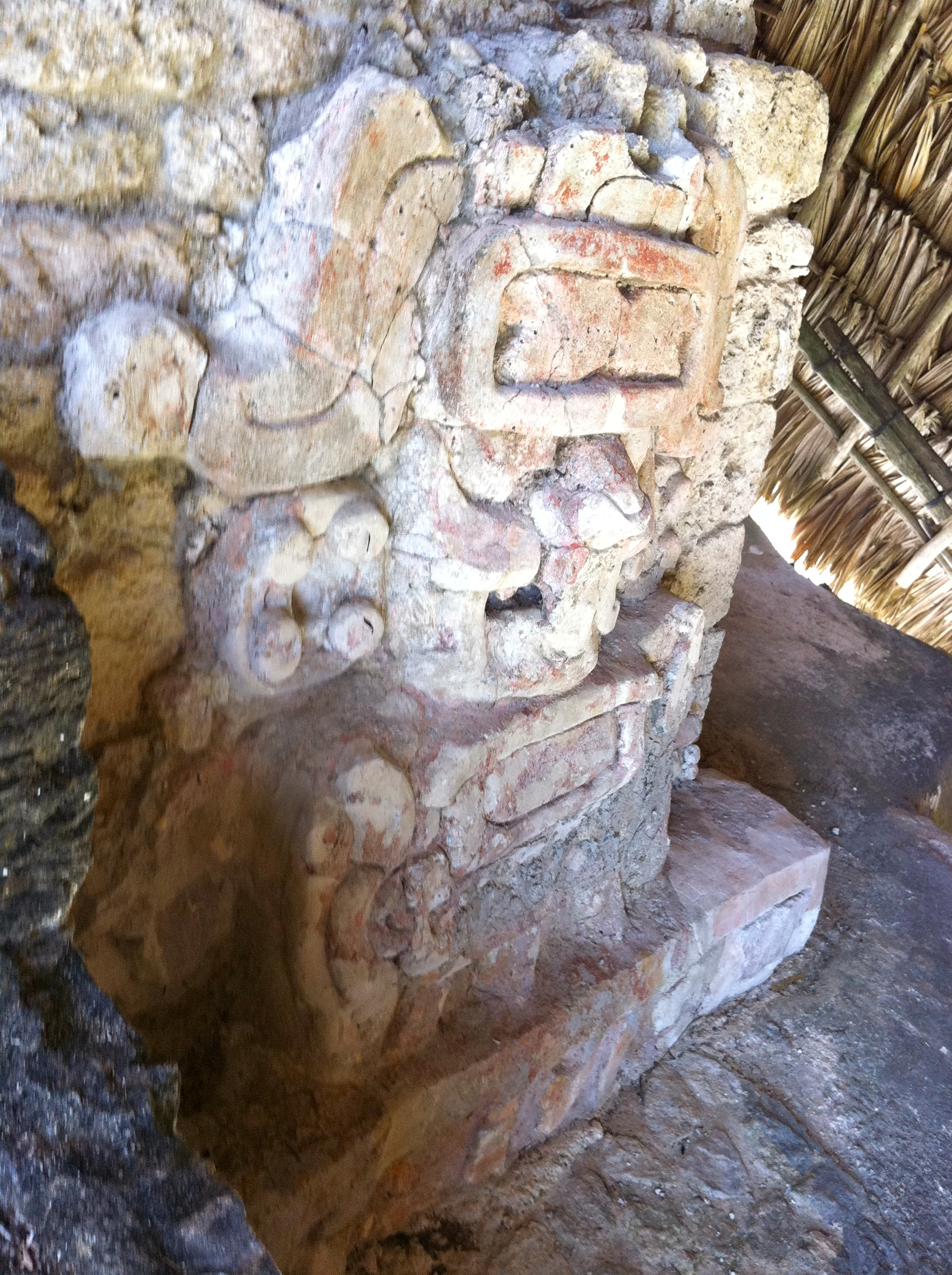
Jaguar Mask

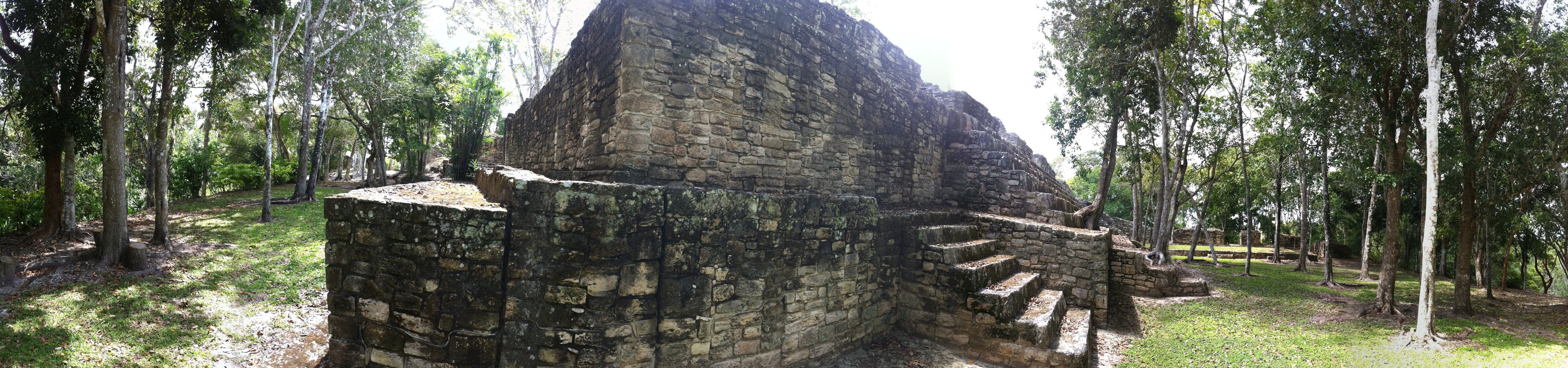

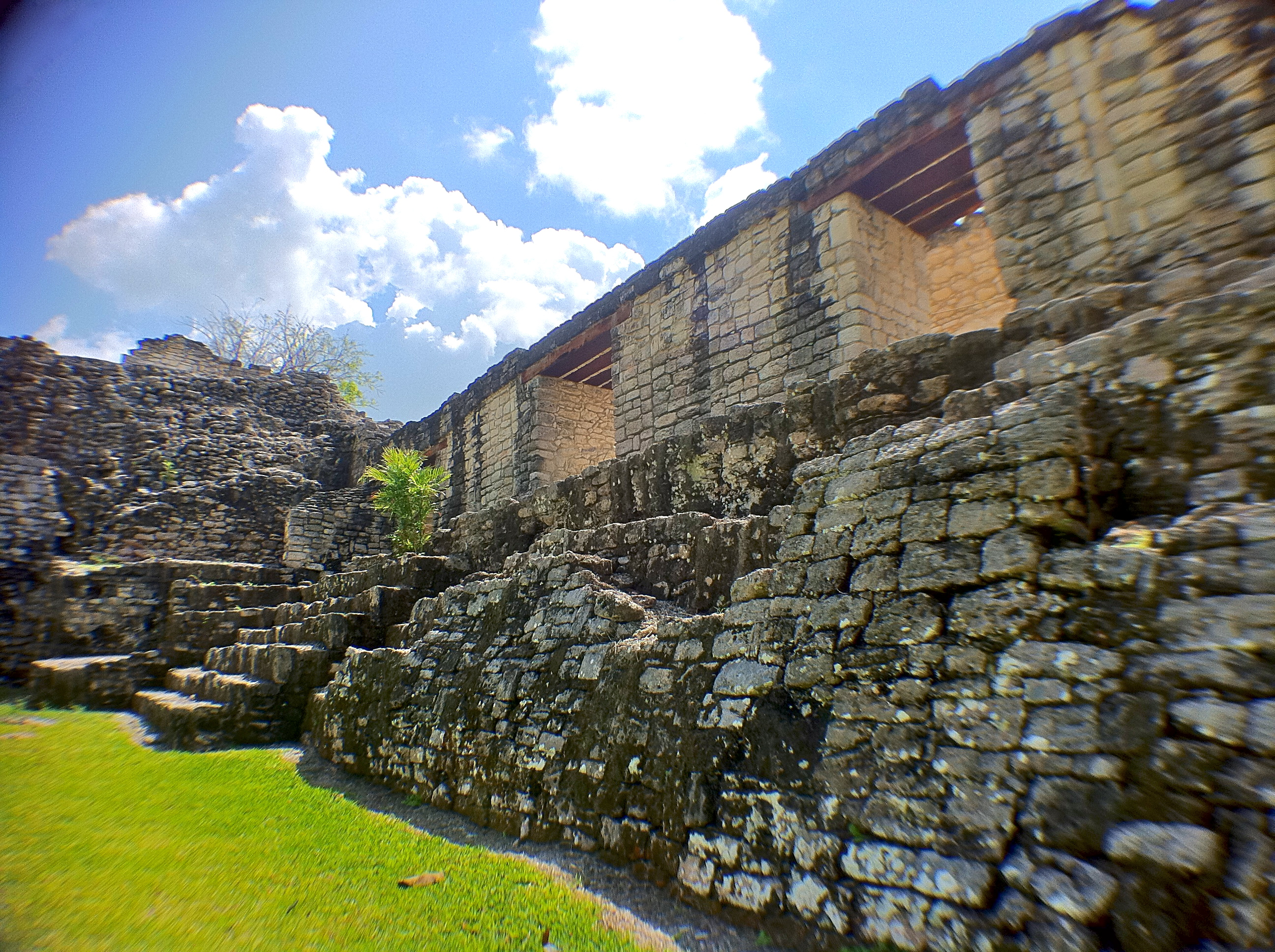

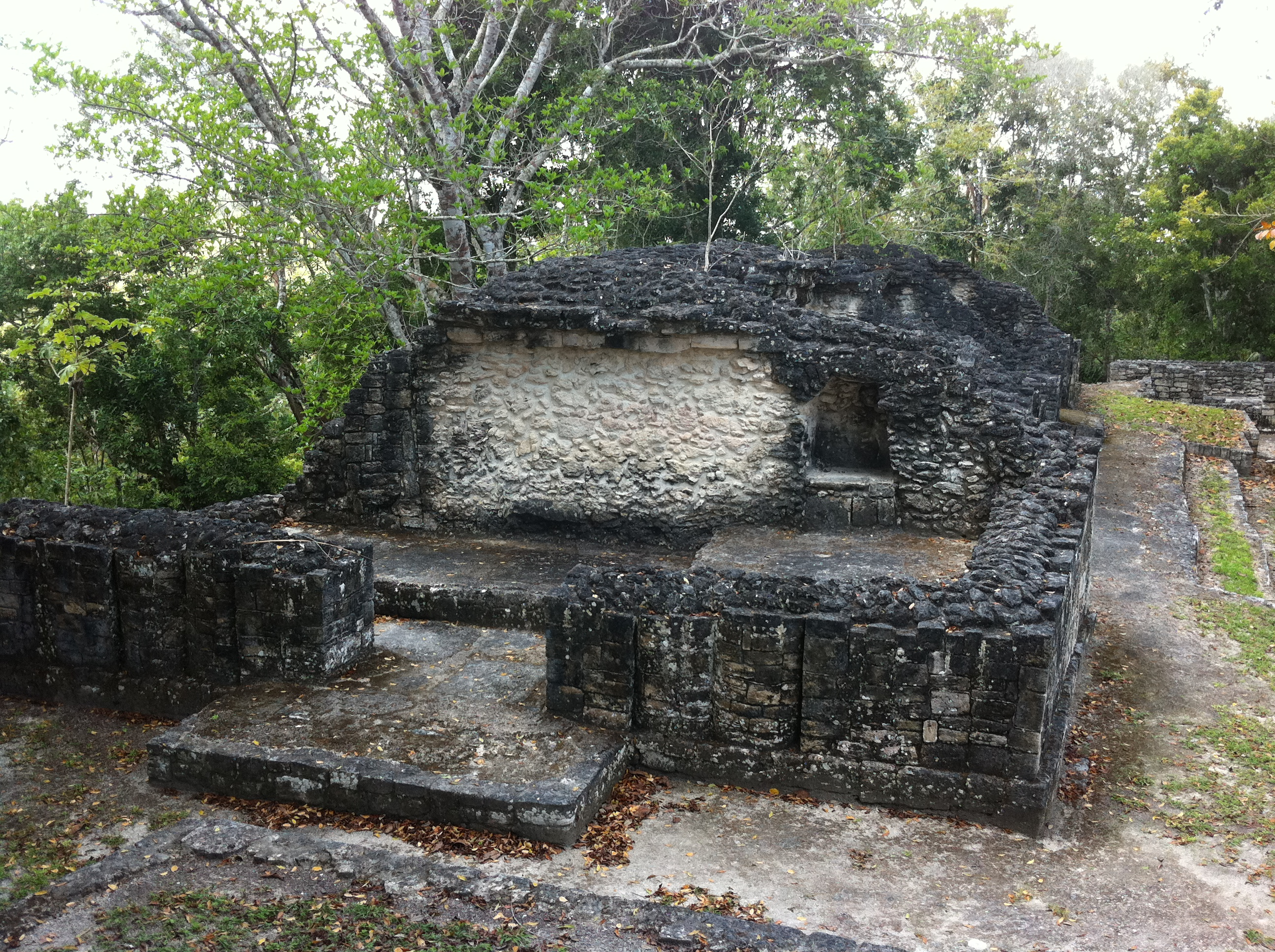

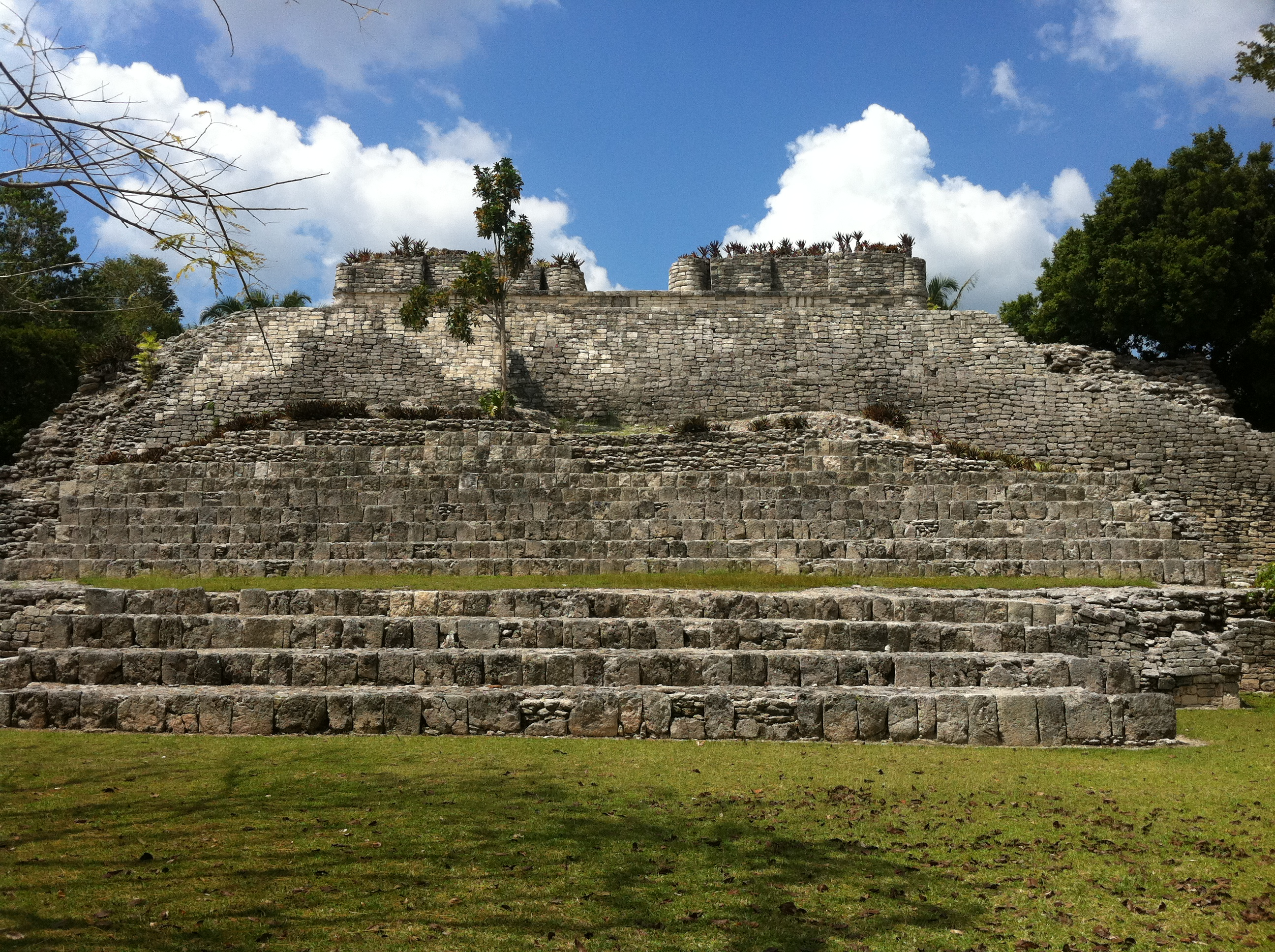

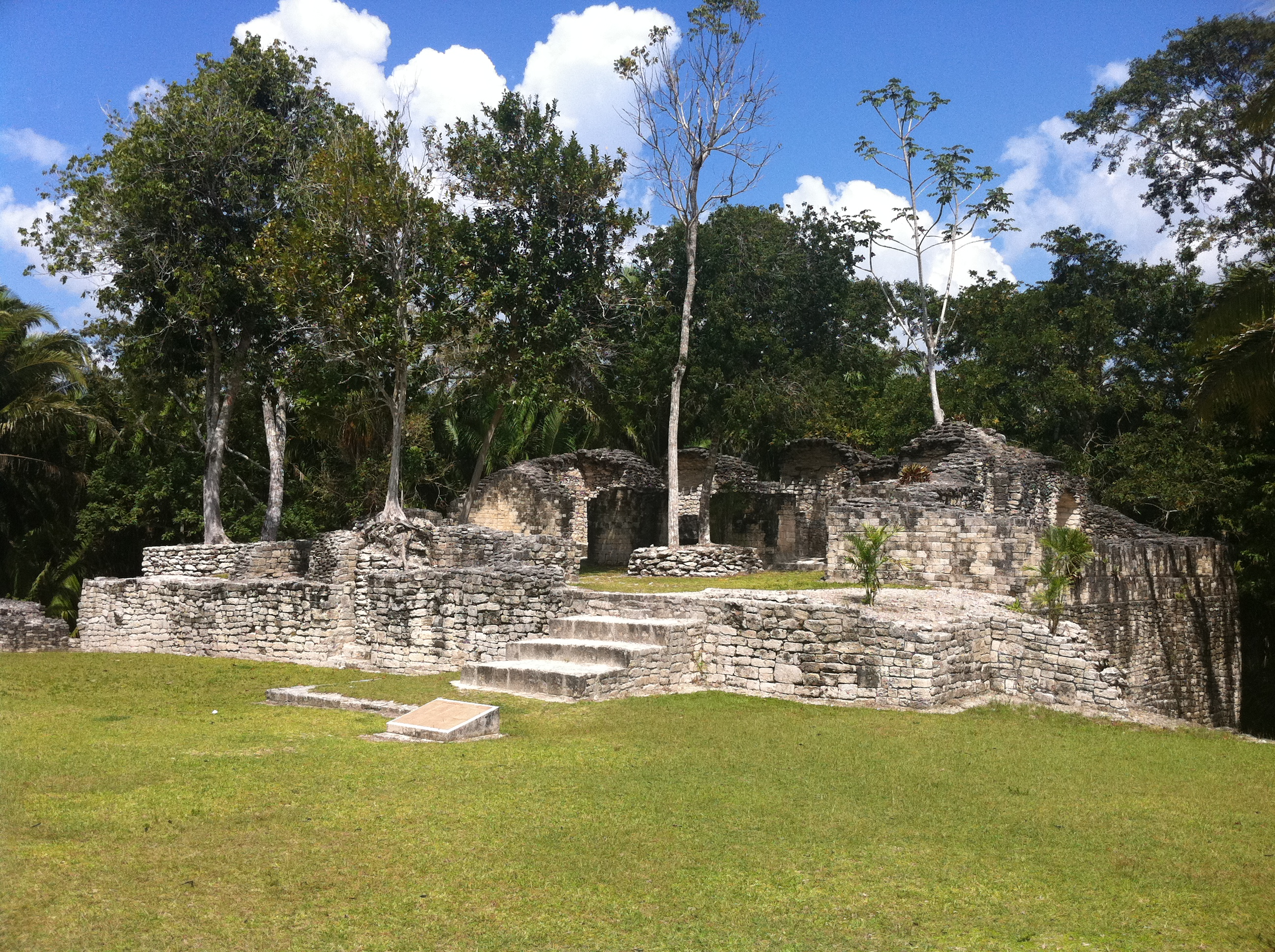
