= Coat of arms of Quintana Roo =

State Shield of Quintana Roo
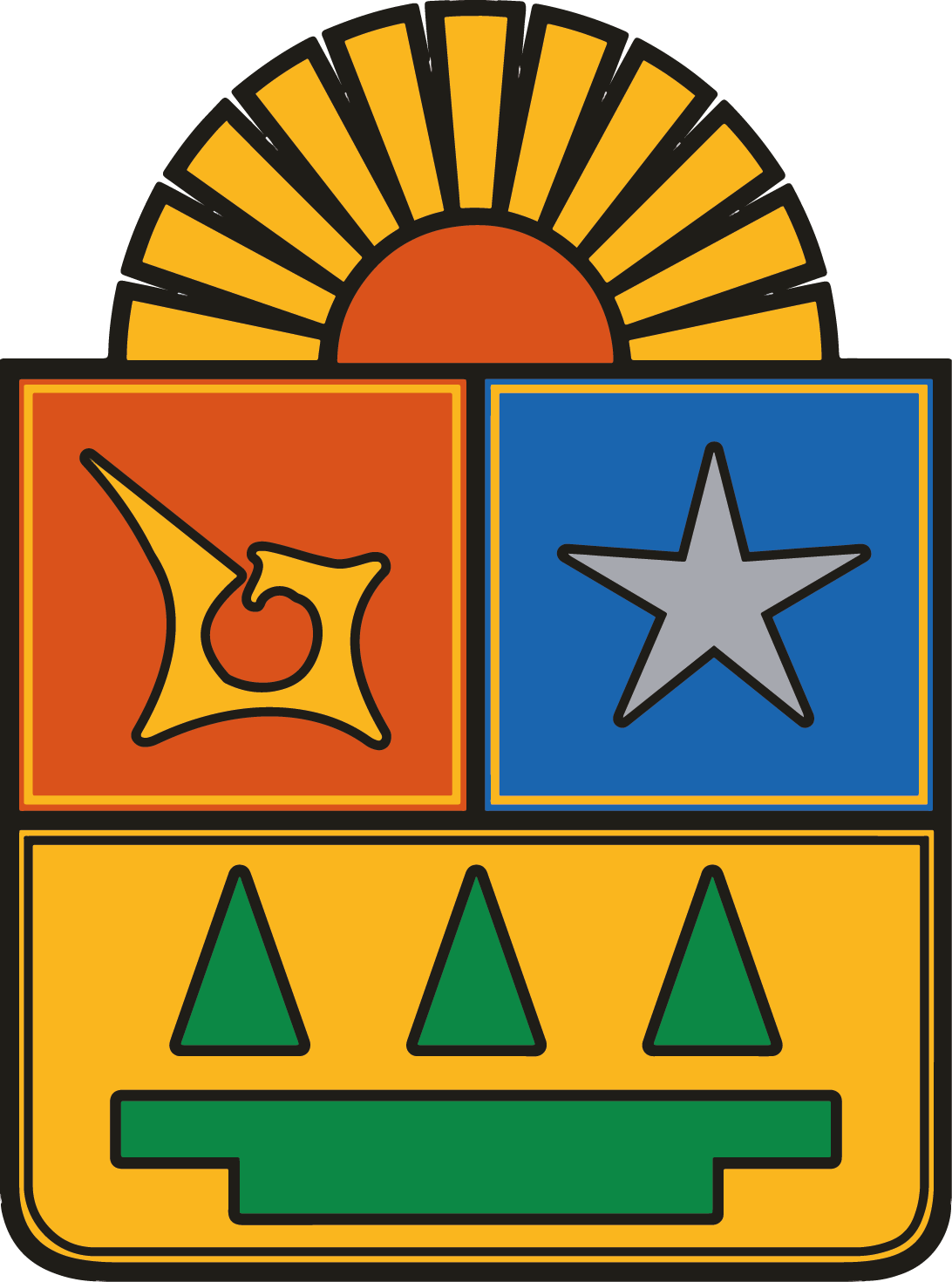
- Armiger: Quintana Roo
- Crest: a rising sun with eleven rays
- Shield: Party per fess: I party per pale, first gules a snail Or, second azure a mullet argent; and II Or a tree vert.

The Coat of arms of Quintana Roo (Spanish: Escudo de Quintana Roo, lit. "state shield of Quintana Roo") is a symbol of the Free and Sovereign State of Quintana Roo. In English, it is blazoned Party per fess: I party per pale, first gules a snail Or, second azure a mullet argent; and II Or a tree vert. And the crest is a rising sun with eleven rays.

== Symbolism ==
The coat of arms of the State of Quintana Roo, is composed with the following characteristics: modern, semi-round, half-divided and cut shield of gules and azure on gold, with a crest figure of the rising sun with eleven bundles of rays in gules and gold. In the upper dexter quarter a stylized snail in gold. In the upper sinister quarter a five-pointed star in silver. At the tip three stable triangles on a Mayan glyph of the wind "IK" in sinople. The emblem borders in quarters and cantons with a simple stripe.

=== Historical coats ===
The symbol is used by all successive regimes in different forms.

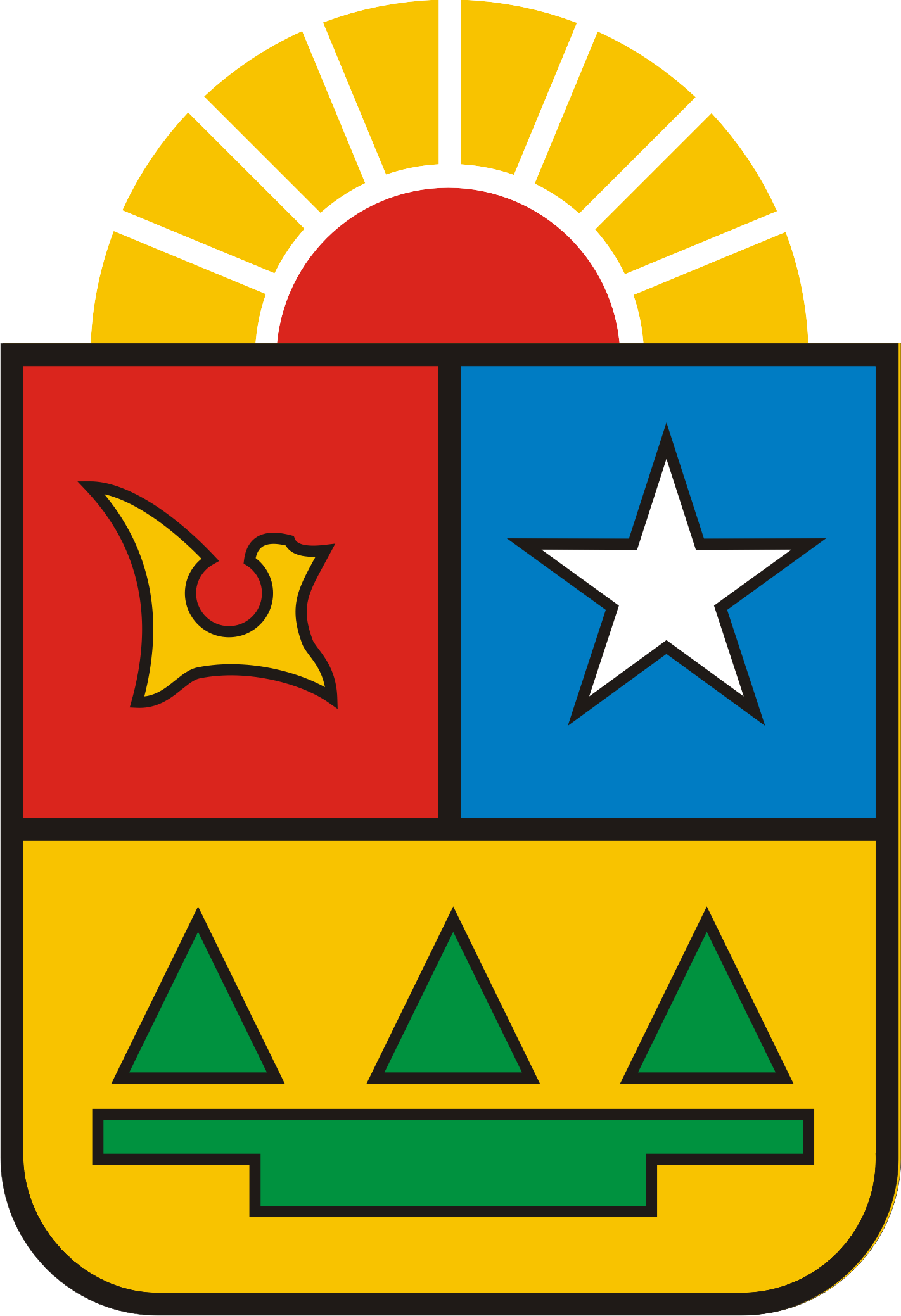
Coat of arms from 1979.

== See also ==
- Flag of Quintana Roo
- Coat of arms of Mexico
