= Xplor Park =

Theme park in Mexico

Parque Xplor
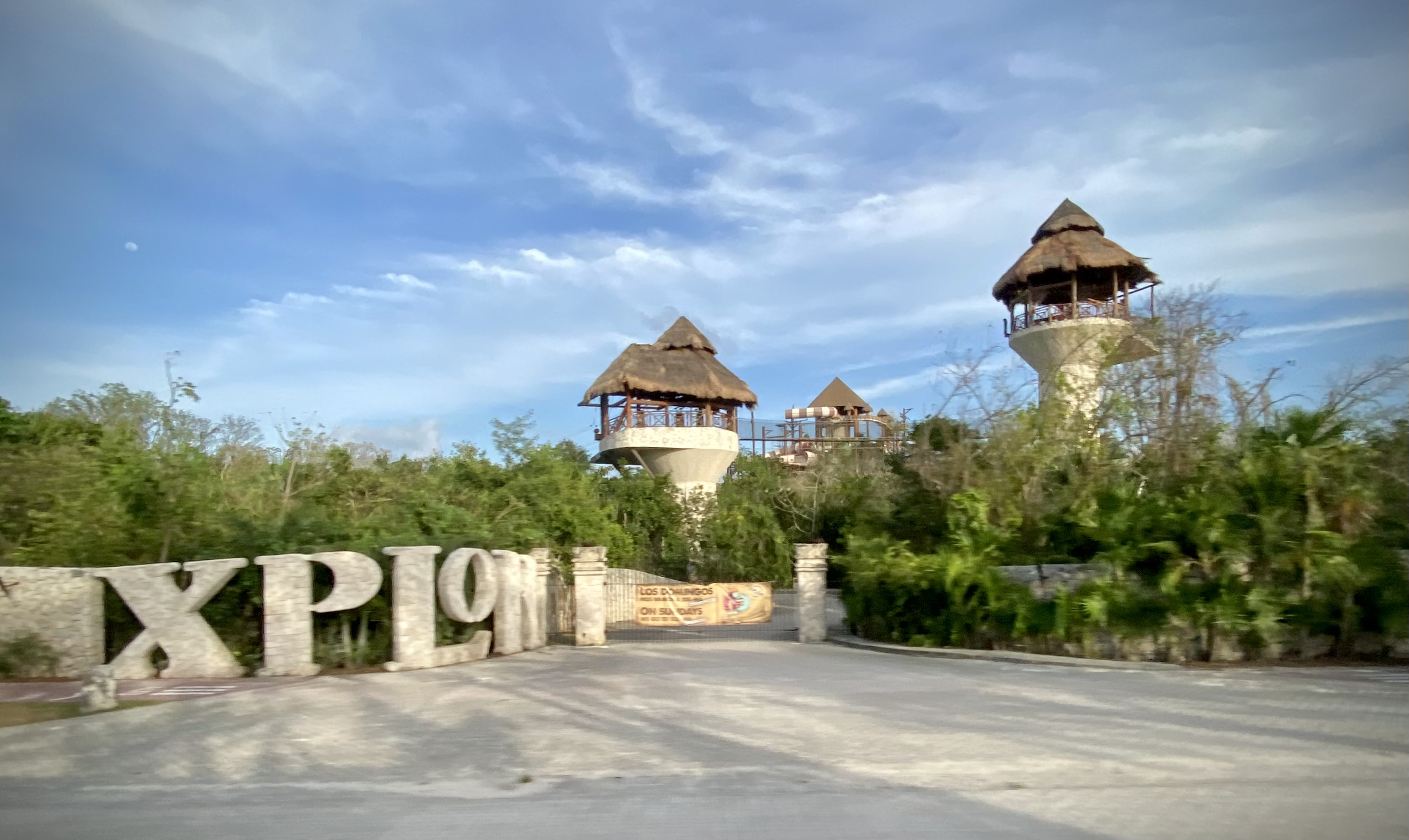
- Entrance of Xplor
- Interactive map of Parque Xplor
- Location: Kilometer Marker 282 Chetumal-Puerto Juárez Highway, Municipality of Solidaridad, Riviera Maya, Quintana Roo, Mexico
- Coordinates: 20°34′41″N 87°07′09″W
- Opened: 2009
- Website: Xplor Park

Xplor Park (Spanish: Parque Xplor) is a theme park in Riviera Maya, Quintana Roo, Mexico, 75 kilometres (47 mi) south of Cancún and 6.5 kilometres (4 mi) south of Playa del Carmen, opening in July 2009. It features entertainment built into the landscape of the Yucatán Peninsula, including rivers and cenotes, and includes two zipline circuits. It is operated by Xcaret Experiencias Group, who also operate other theme parks in Mexico, including Xcaret Park, the Xel-Ha Park, and the Xenses Park.

By 2017, 2.5 million people had visited, and in 2018 over 2,000 people per day rode the zip-line courses.

== Attractions ==
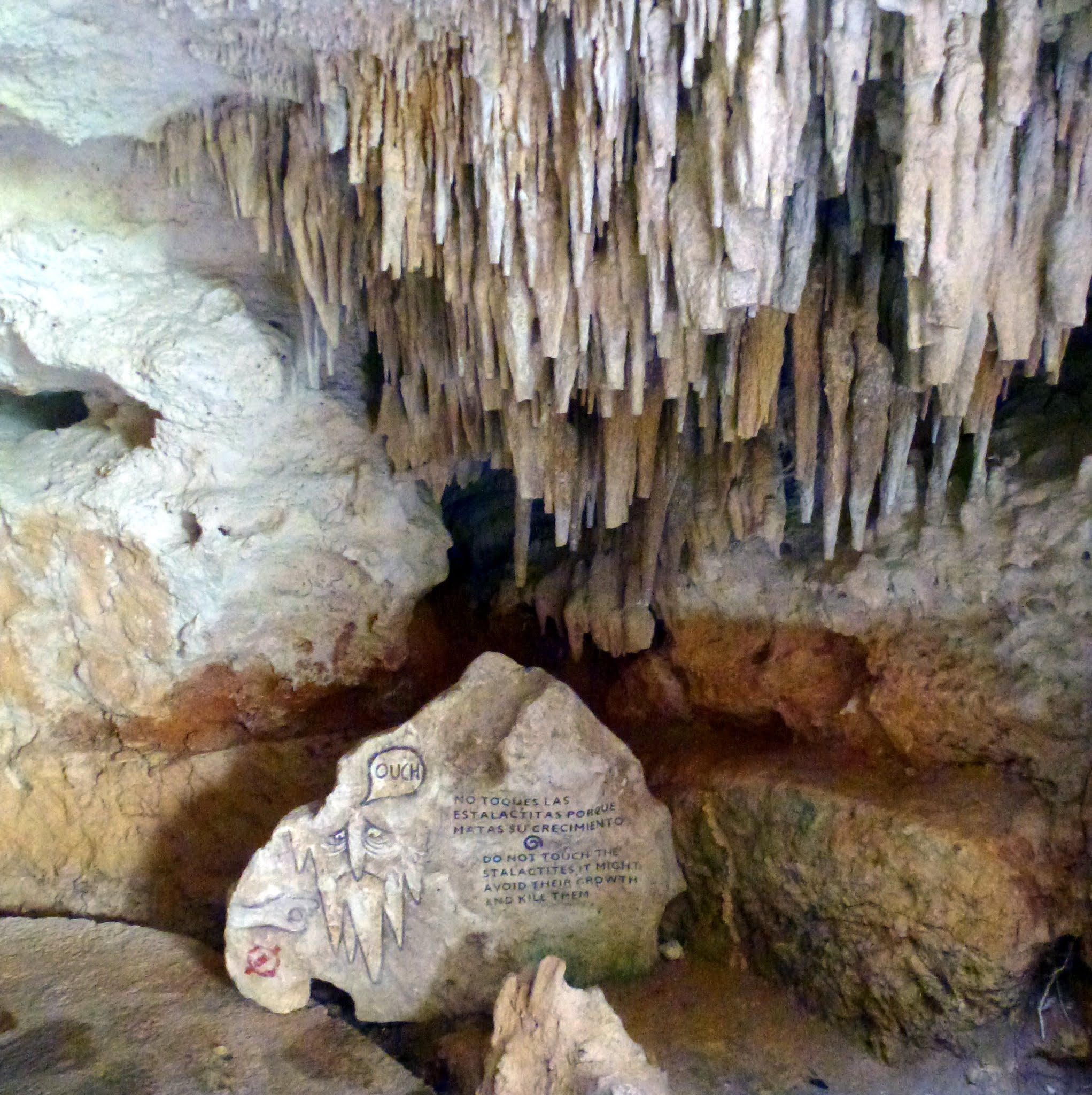
A cave at Xplor Park

Two zip line circuits are the park’s main attraction, each made up of seven segments. The lines span a total of 3.7 kilometers (2.3 miles), and rise to heights of up to 18 meters (60 feet) above the forest canopy.

The all-terrain Amphibious Vehicles course is about 5 kilometers (3.1 miles) long, and travels across land, over water, and through caves.

Several additional attractions follow underground cave rivers, where visitors move through illuminated water surrounded by stalactites, stalagmites, and exposed tree roots.

The Underground Expedition, opened in March 2020, combines jungle paths and cave rivers, allowing visitors to wade through water and tackle obstacle courses in and out of the water. It finishes with two body slides.

On 21 March 2024, the park opened Toboganxotes, a 5-in-1 raft slide designed for four riders at a time. Built by ProSlide, it opened alongside a new wave pool. The structure stands 41 meters (135 feet) tall, stretches 320 meters (1,050 feet) in length, and lasts about 75 seconds per ride.

The park closes in the late afternoon and reopens in the early evening for its nighttime version, Xplor Fuego. The attractions are largely the same as during the day, although only one of the two zipline circuits operates at night.

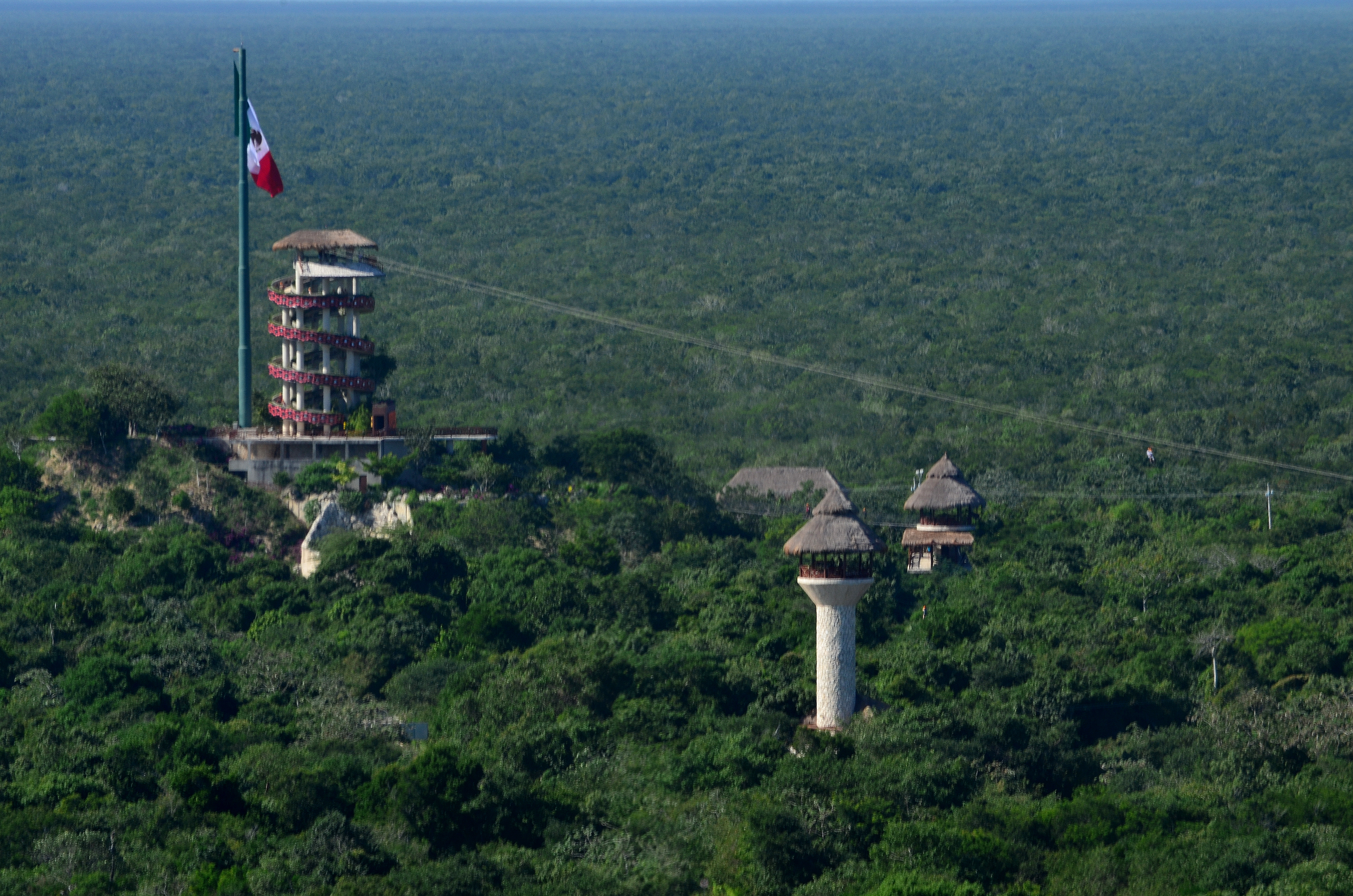
A tract of ziplines at Xplor

== Awards ==
- In 2017, Xplor earned "Best Adventure Park in the World" status from the Association for Challenge Course Technology.
- In 2017, Xplor was awarded "Best Adventure Park in Mexico" by Petzl.
