= Xelha (disambiguation) =

Xelha or Xel-Ha may refer to:

- Xelha, an archaeological site of the pre-Columbian Maya civilization, located on the eastern coast of the Yucatán Peninsula, Mexico
- Xel-Ha Park, a commercial water theme park and ecotourism facility in the state of Quintana Roo, Mexico
- Xelha, a character in the video game Baten Kaitos: Eternal Wings and the Lost Ocean
