= Riviera Maya =

Tourist resort district near Cancún, Mexico

Coordinates: 20°37′53″N 87°04′23″W

- Municipality
- Map of the Riviera Maya in Quintana Roo. From north to south: Puerto Morelos, Tres Ríos, Playa del Carmen, Xcaret, Paamul, Puerto Aventuras, Xpu Há, Akumal, Xel-Há, Bahía de Punta Soliman, Tankah, Tulum, Boca Paila, Punta Allen. Cozumel is not within it.
- Interactive map of Riviera Maya
- Country: Mexico
- State: Quintana Roo
- Largest settlement: Playa del Carmen

Dimensions
  - Length: 210 km (130 mi)

Population (2020)
  - Total: 305,000
- Time zone: UTC-6 (EST)

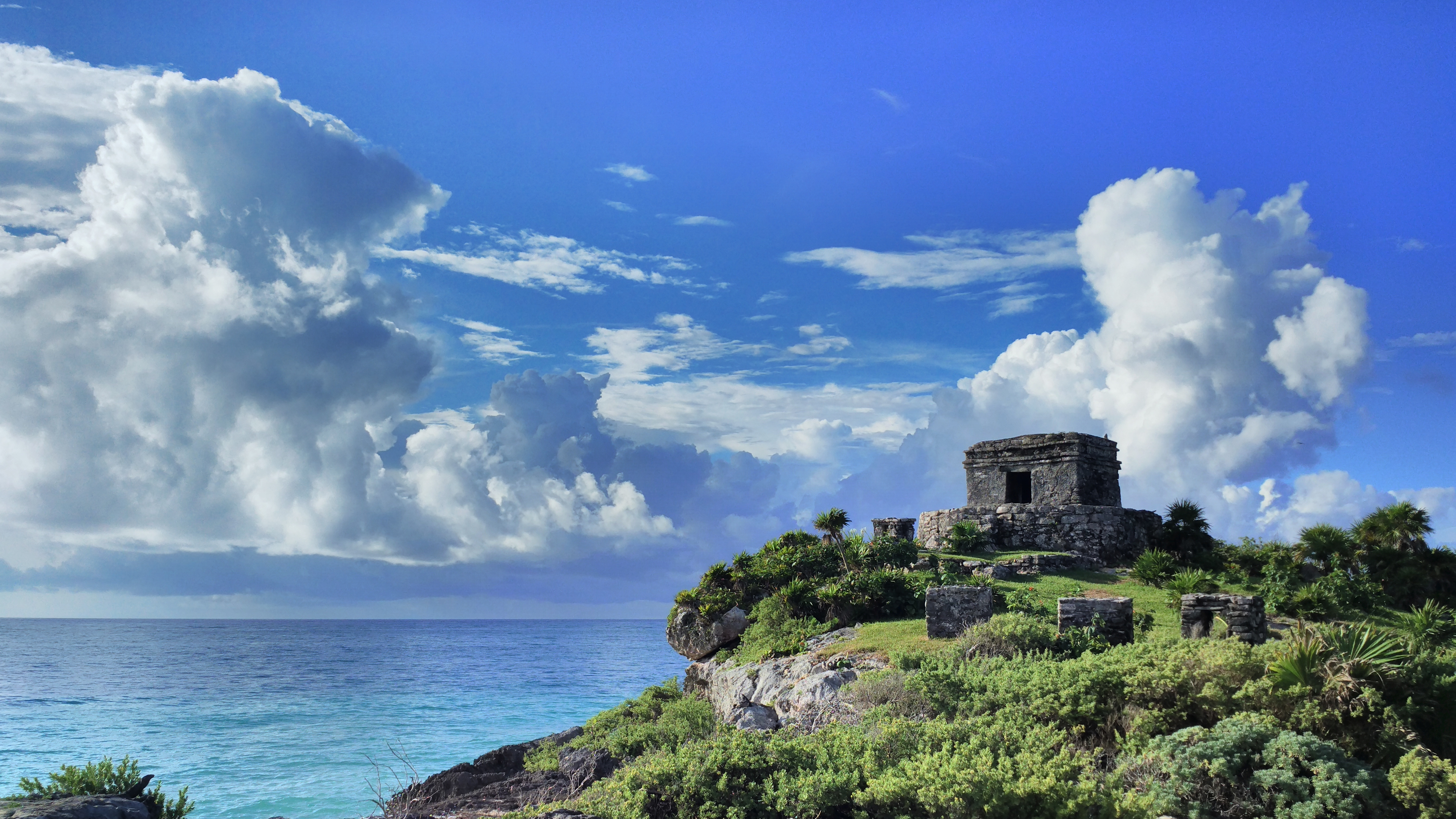
Tulum is in the Riviera Maya

The Riviera Maya (Spanish pronunciation: [ri'βjeɾa 'maʝa]) is a tourism and resort district located to the south of Cancún, Mexico. It straddles the coastal Federal Highway 307, along the Caribbean coastline of the state of Quintana Roo, located in the eastern portion of the Yucatán Peninsula. Originally the name applied narrowly, focusing on the area of coastline between the city of Playa del Carmen and Tulum. The designation has since expanded up and down the coast, now including the towns of Puerto Morelos, situated to the north of Playa del Carmen, as well as the town of Felipe Carrillo Puerto, situated 40 km (25 mi) to the south of Tulum. This larger region is what is currently being promoted as part of the Riviera Maya tourist corridor.

Once the area was originally only called the "Cancun–Tulum corridor", but in 1999 it was renamed as the Riviera Maya, analogous to the Italian and French Riviera, with the instigation of among others, Miguel Ramón Martín Azueta. At the time, he was the municipal president of Solidaridad, Quintana Roo. The Riviera Maya includes the municipalities of Solidaridad in the north and Tulum in the south, and extends approximately 40 km (25 mi) inland, to the border with the state of Yucatán.

== Tourism ==
The Riviera Maya is famous for its large scale all-inclusive resorts and a historical tourism base of smaller boutique hotels as well as the many fine-dining restaurants available along the Fed 307 and on or near the beaches. Luxury travel entities have been instrumental in increasing luxury villa rentals and yacht charters in the area however these only represent a small fraction of the total tourism accommodation available.

Government development plans include establishing a number of medium-sized cities of ~200,000 inhabitants within the Riviera Maya with initial planning spanning 20 years. Target areas for urbanization include the towns and villages of: Puerto Aventuras, Akumal, Chemuyil, and Tulum.

A major attraction throughout the Riviera Maya are coastal and reef aquatic activities dependent on the beaches, coastal water and the Mesoamerican Barrier Reef System (also known as the Great Mayan Reef) which begins near Cancun and continues along the whole length of the Riviera Maya continuing southward to Guatemala. This barrier reef system is the second longest in the world.

Activities at the most visited locations include jet-skiing, snorkeling, scuba diving, swimming in cenotes, swimming with dolphins, zip-lining, horse riding, sailing, and guided jungle tours. Archeology is also a big tourist draw in the area, including the popular archeological sites of the ancient Maya civilization, operated by the Instituto Nacional de Archeological, such as Tulum on the coast, and Chichen Itza and Coba located some distance inland. The self-named ecoparks of Xcaret and Xel-Ha also include some smaller archeological ruins as part of their attractions, but these natural water theme parks operated by private business consortia attract much larger crowds due to the diversity and range of activities provided, such as swimming with captive dolphins.

== Climate ==
The mean annual temperature is 24–25 °C (75–77 °F). The climate is dominated by a rainy season from May through November, and within the dry season there is a period dominated by northerly winds, called El Norte, which usually occurs in the months of January and February. The maximum mean annual precipitation throughout the Yucatán Peninsula occurs along the coast of the Riviera Maya with 1,500 mm (59 in) of rainfall with a general decline to the NW with only 400 mm (16 in) per year or less on the opposite side of the Peninsula. While the Caribbean coast of the Yucatán experiences a large number of tropical storms and hurricanes, the storm tracks and therefore landfalls of these are divergent to both the north (Cancun) and the south (south of Tulum and down to Belize) striking generally outside the Riviera Maya. Groundwater and therefore cenote water temperatures are 25 °C (77 °F) year round. Coastal waters range from 26 °C (79 °F) in January to 29 °C (84 °F) in August.

== Geography ==
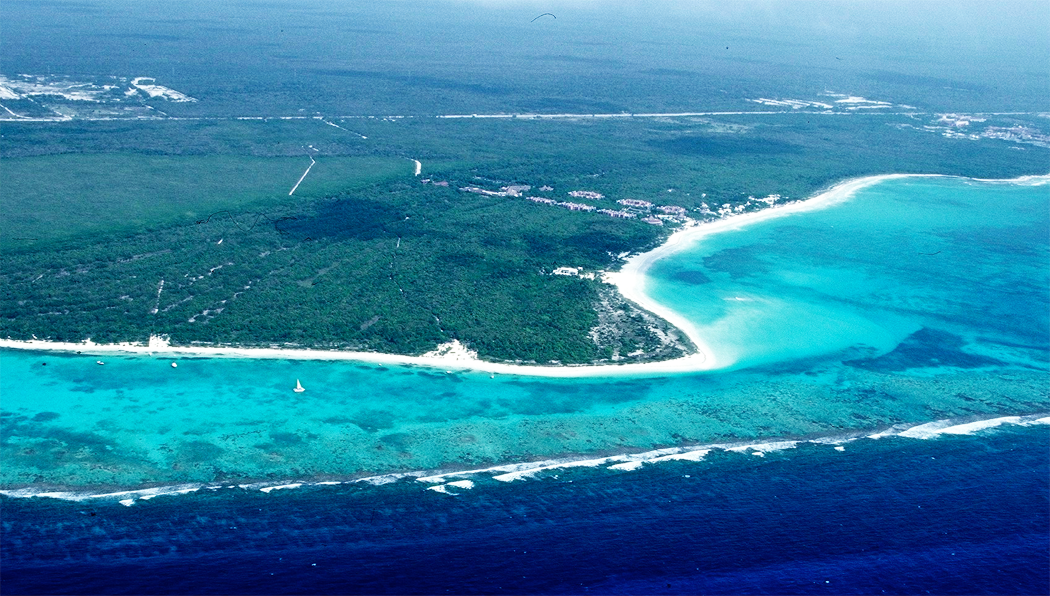
Punta Maroma, Riviera Maya, Mexico

The Riviera Maya is completely within the state of Quintana Roo on the Yucatán Peninsula of Mexico. The terrain is flat and covered by low tropical jungle. The geology is high purity carbonates down to a depth of 0.5–1.5 km below the surface. Mean annual rainfall is 1.5 m per year and the efficient infiltration results in the complete absence of any surface rivers. As is common in karst, underground river networks have formed by dissolution, and these have been explored and mapped by cave diving through sinkhole collapses, locally called cenotes.

The whole of the Yucatán Peninsula is underlain by a density-stratified coastal aquifer system with a lens-shaped freshwater body floating on top of intruding saline water. The formation of caves (speleogenesis) within this coastal carbonate aquifer is principally associated with carbonate dissolution at the fresh-saline water contact within the aquifer. By 2008, the Quintana Roo Speleological Society (QRSS) reported more than 700 km (430 mi) of flooded cave passages within the limits of the Riviera Maya including the two longest underwater cave systems in the world of Sac Actun and Ox Bel Ha. These groundwater resources, accessed via the thousands of cenotes throughout the landscape, once supported the Maya civilizations and today remain the only natural sources of potable water in the area.

The Caribbean coastline is a series of crescent shaped white sand beaches interrupted every 1–10 km by rocky headlands and inlets, called caletas, through which groundwater discharges into the coastal water. Large sections of the extensive mangrove swamps that lie behind the beaches and headlands are included in the areas scheduled for tourism development.

== Transportation ==
Most tourists to the Riviera Maya arrive through Cancún International Airport, approximately 50 km (31 mi) north of Playa del Carmen.

About 20 km (12 mi) north of Tulum, a new international airport was announced. In March 2011, the bidding for construction contracts was to be concluded.

The Tulum International Airport was finished in December 2023.

In 2018, construction started on the Tren Maya, which would run the length of the Riviera Maya and connect it with other destinations on the Yucatán peninsula.

== See also ==
- Mexican Riviera
- Riviera Nayarit
- Cenote
- Hotel Zone (Cancún)
