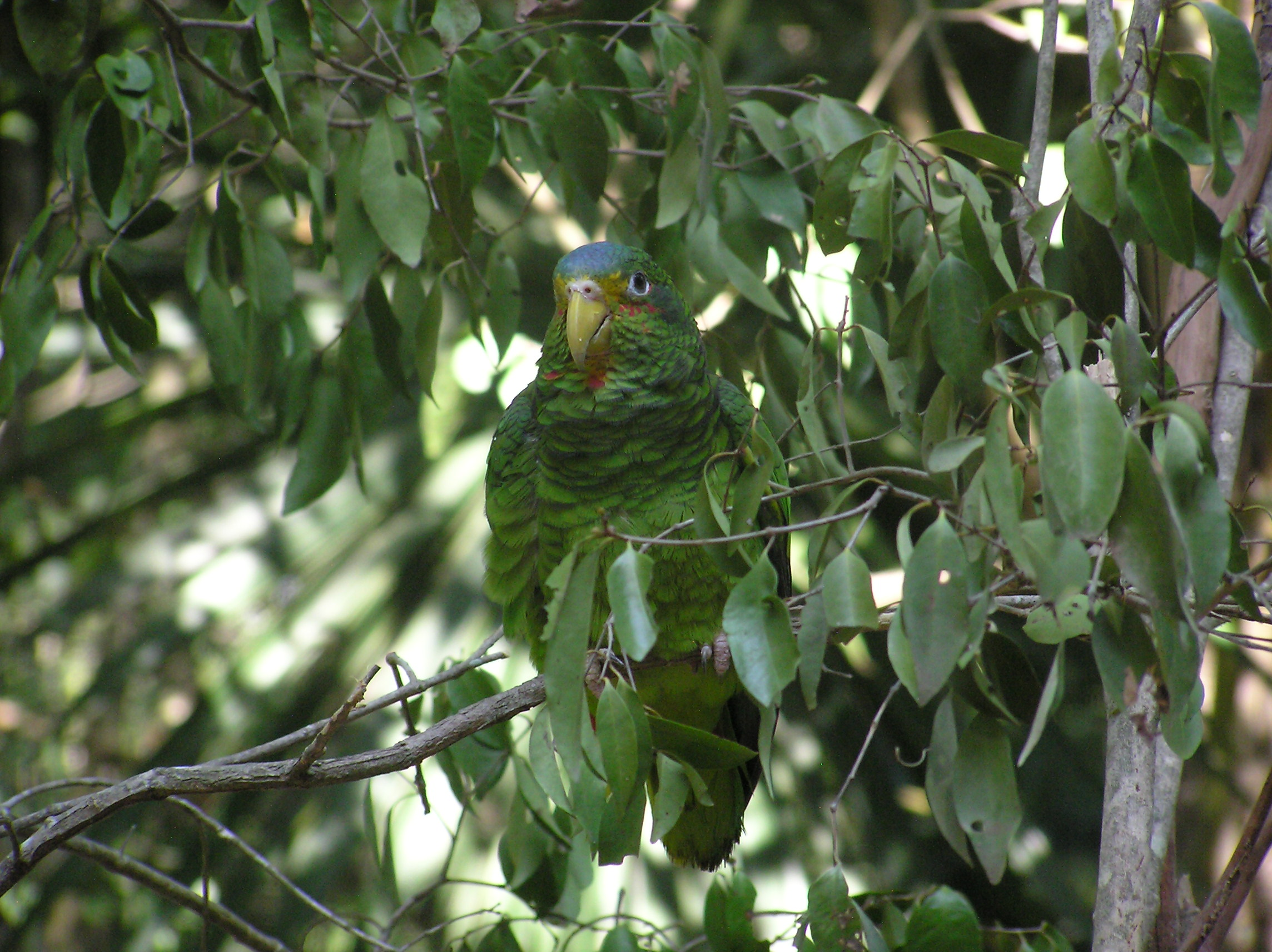
- Female at Xcaret Eco Park, Mexico

Conservation status
- Least Concern (IUCN 3.1)
- CITES Appendix II (CITES)

Scientific classification
- Kingdom: Animalia
- Phylum: Chordata
- Class: Aves
- Order: Psittaciformes
- Family: Psittacidae
- Genus: Amazona
- Species: A. xantholora

Binomial name
- Amazona xantholora (Gray, 1859)

= Yucatan amazon =

Species of bird

The Yucatan amazon (Amazona xantholora), also known as the yellow-lored amazon, Yucatan parrot or yellow-lored parrot is a species of bird in subfamily Arinae of the family Psittacidae, the African and New World parrots. It is found in Belize, Guatemala, Honduras, and Mexico.

== Taxonomy and systematics ==
The Yucatan amazon is monotypic.

== Description ==
The Yucatan amazon is 25.5 to 28 cm (10 to 11 in) long and weighs 200 to 232 g (7.1 to 8.2 oz). It is mostly green. Adult males are chrome yellow on their lores and the sides of their forehead; the rest of the forehead and most of their crown are white. The area around and behind their eye is red and their ear coverts are dusky. Their rear crown is greenish blue, their nape green, and the rest of their upperparts and their underparts are yellowish green. Most of the body feathers have black edges that give a scalloped appearance. Their middle pair of tail feathers are green with pale yellowish green tips, the next pair are yellowish green with a yellow base and a red streak near the base, and the rest have progressively more red replacing the yellowish green. Their wing's leading edge and primary coverts are red, the outermost primaries are green with blue towards the end, and the rest of their primaries and their secondaries are rich blue. Their iris is orange surrounded by bare white skin and their bill and legs are yellow. Adult females differ from males with a greenish blue forehead and crown, paler yellow lores, very little red on the face, traces of duskiness on the ear coverts, and green primary coverts.

== Distribution and habitat ==
The Yucatan amazon is found throughout the Yucatán Peninsula in the states of Quintana Roo, Yucatán, and Campeche and slightly into northern Belize. A significant population also resides on Isla Cozumel. A specimen was collected in 1947 on the Honduran island of Roatán and there are a few eBird records from there and many from northern Guatemala. The species is found in the interior and edges of deciduous and semi-deciduous forest, both primary and secondary, and also in pine savannah. It elevation it ranges from sea level up to about 100 m (300 ft).

== Behavior ==
=== Flocking ===
Flocks of thirty or more typically move together between roosting and foraging sites, and roosts may contain 1500 individuals.

=== Feeding ===
The Yucatan amazon's diet has not been studied, but is assumed to include seeds, fruits, flowers, nuts, legumes, and crops like the diet of the white-fronted amazon (A. albifrons).

=== Breeding ===
The Yucatan amazon's breeding season has not been fully described but appears to include March to May. It nests in hollows in trees or stumps. The clutch size is four or five eggs and the incubation period is 22 to 28 days. The time to fledging and details of parental care are not known.

=== Vocalization ===
The Yucatan amazon is highly vocal except when feeding. A characteristic call by pairs is a barking "rek-rek-rek-rek or rek-rek rek-rek rrehr". Other calls include "a rolled reeeah-h and kyeh-kyeh keeei-i-iirr, and screechy ree-o-rak zeek ree-o-rah."

== Status ==
The IUCN has assessed the Yucatan amazon as being of Least Concern. It has a large range and an estimated population of between 20,000 and 50,000 mature individuals, though the latter is believed to be decreasing. Logging and the pet trade are identified as potential threats. "Large-scale development of vacation properties also threatens to destroy and fragment remaining tropical deciduous forests along Mexico's Yucatan Peninsula."

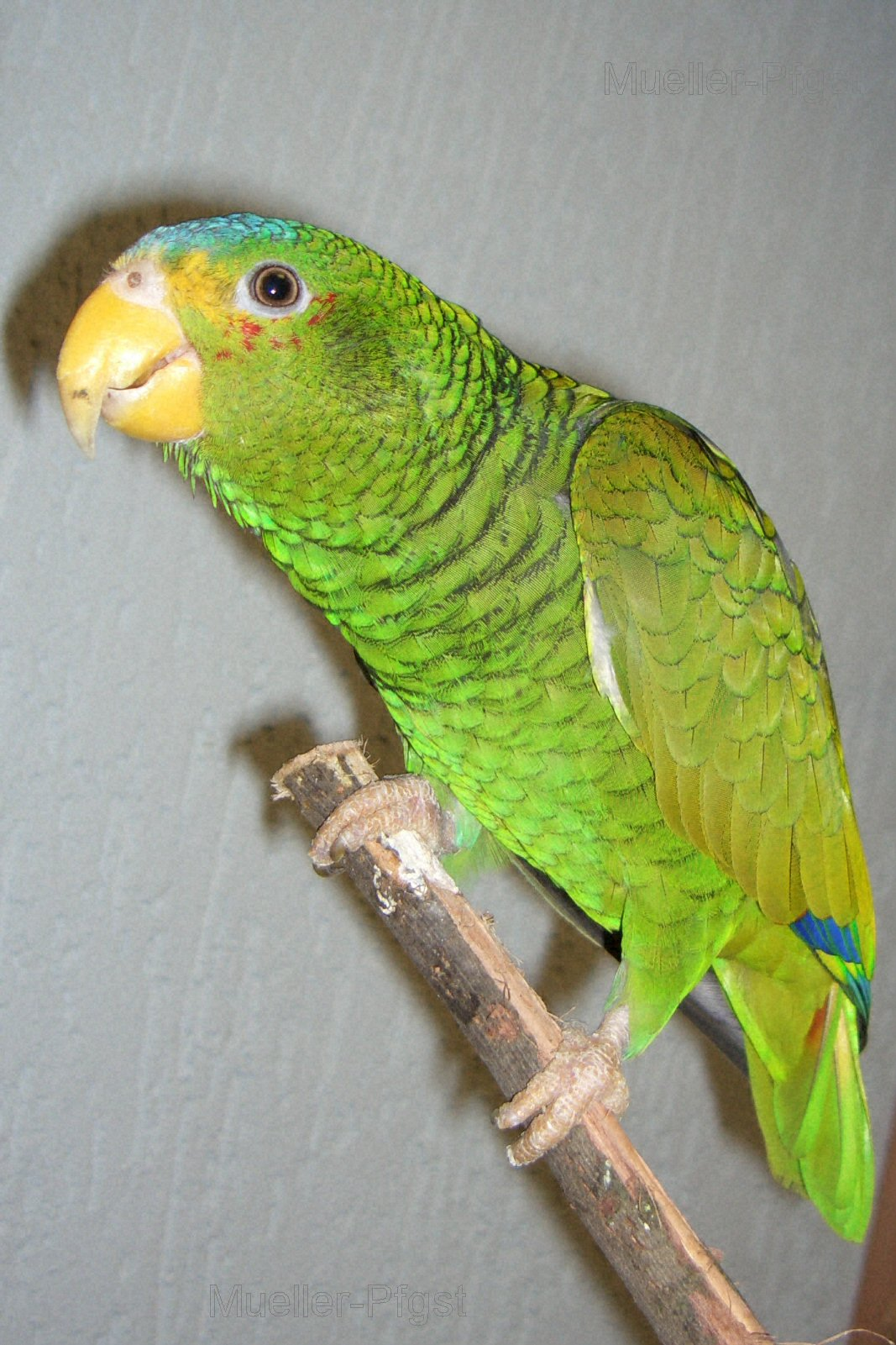
Pet

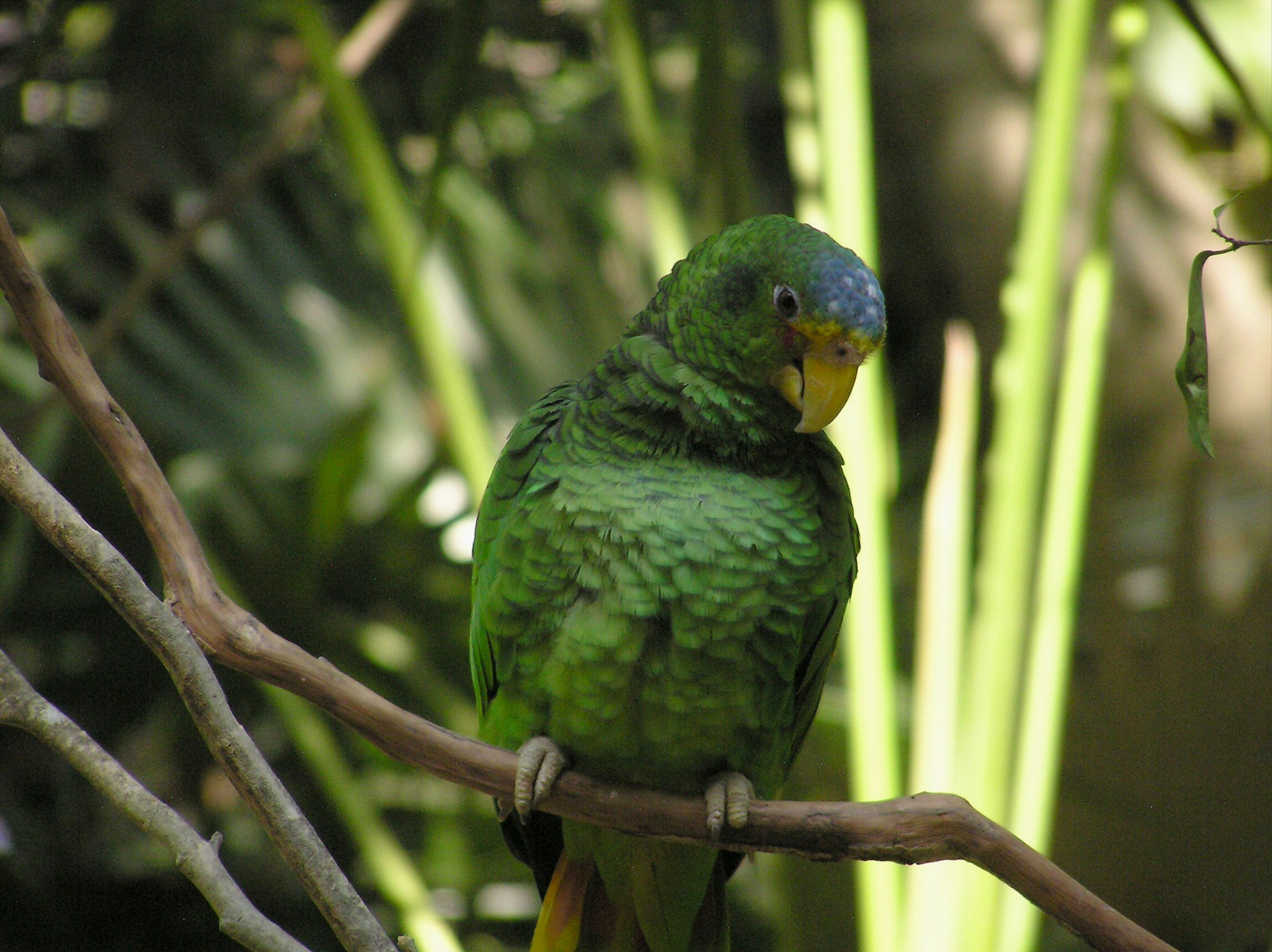
Female at Xcaret Park
