= Hotel Club Akumal Caribe =

Resort in Quintana Roo, Mexico

Coordinates: 20.3970°N 87.3146°W

Hotel Club Akumal Caribe is a resort situated along the shore of Akumal Bay (62 miles south of Cancún), in the Caribbean tourism district known as the Riviera Maya in Quintana Roo, Mexico.

The resort is still largely owned by the Pablo Bush family, who also founded Akumal, a diving town established in the 1950s. Considered the first resort in Akumal, Hotel Club Akumal Caribe remains an independent, family-run establishment. Its symbol, a tribal depiction of a turtle, is derived from the Mayan word "Akumal," which is commonly translated as "place of the turtles." This symbol reflects the year-round presence of green and Hawksbill turtles in Akumal Bay.
