= Xpu Há =

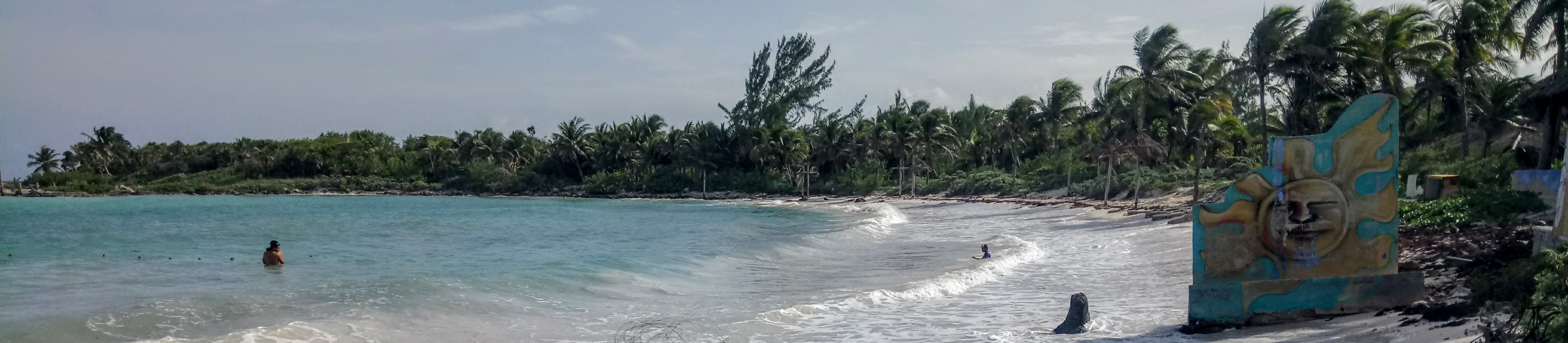

- Location within Quintana Roo Location within Mexico
- Coordinates: 20.4745889°N 87.265105°W
- Country: Mexico
- State: Quintana Roo
- Municipality: Solidaridad

Population (2010)
  - Total: 36
- Time zone: UTC-6 (CST)

Xpu Há (Spanish pronunciation: [(i)ʃpuˈxa]) is a bay, village, and resort area in Solidaridad municipality of Quintana Roo state, on the Mayan Riviera in southeastern Mexico.

It is 34 kilometres (21 mi) from Playa del Carmen, and 93 kilometres (58 mi) from Cancún. It is in the municipality of Solidaridad, Quintana Roo, Mexico.

Xpu Há has an assortment of hotels, cabins, restaurants, and dive shops for tourists. At the north of Xpu Há Bay is the Cenote Manati, one of the largest natural water cenotes in the region.

According to INEGI, the village has only two full-time inhabitants and one year-round occupied dwelling.
