= Xcaret Park =

Theme park in Mexico

Parque Xcaret
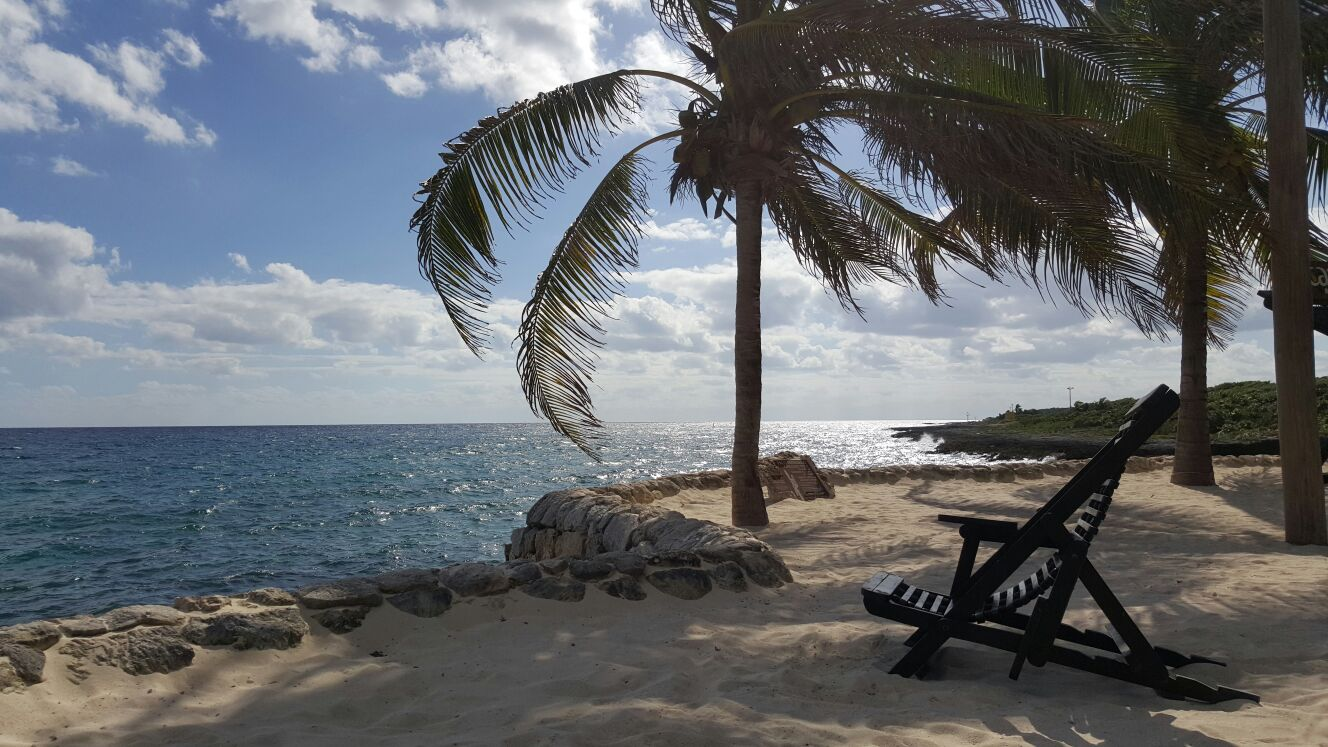
- Xcaret Eco Park
- Interactive map of Parque Xcaret
- Location: Kilometer Marker 282 Chetumal-Puerto Juárez Highway, Municipality of Solidaridad, Riviera Maya, Quintana Roo, Mexico
- Coordinates: 20°34′41″N 87°07′09″W
- Opened: 1991
- Owner: Miguel Quintana Pali
- Area: 81 ha (200 acres)
- Website: Xcaret Eco Park

Xcaret Park (Spanish: Parque Xcaret; Spanish pronunciation: [ˈpaɾke ʃkaˈɾet]) is a privately owned and operated theme park, resort and self-described ecotourism development located in the Riviera Maya, a portion of the Caribbean coastline of the Mexican state of Quintana Roo. It is part of Xcaret Experiencias Group which also owns the Xplor Park, Xel-Ha Park, and Xenses Park; as well as the Xichen, Xenotes, Xavage and Xoximilco tours and activities. It is situated approximately 75 kilometres (47 mi) south of Cancún, and 6.5 kilometres (4 mi) south of the nearest large settlement Playa del Carmen along Highway 307. It is named after the nearby archaeological site Xcaret, a settlement constructed by the pre-Columbian Maya some of whose structures lie within the boundaries of the park's 81 hectares (200 acres) of land holdings.

From 2010 to 2015, Xcaret Experiencias has been recognized as one of The Best Mexican Companies (Las Mejores Empresas Mexicanas), a recognition promoted by Banamex, Deloitte México and Tecnológico de Monterrey.

== History ==
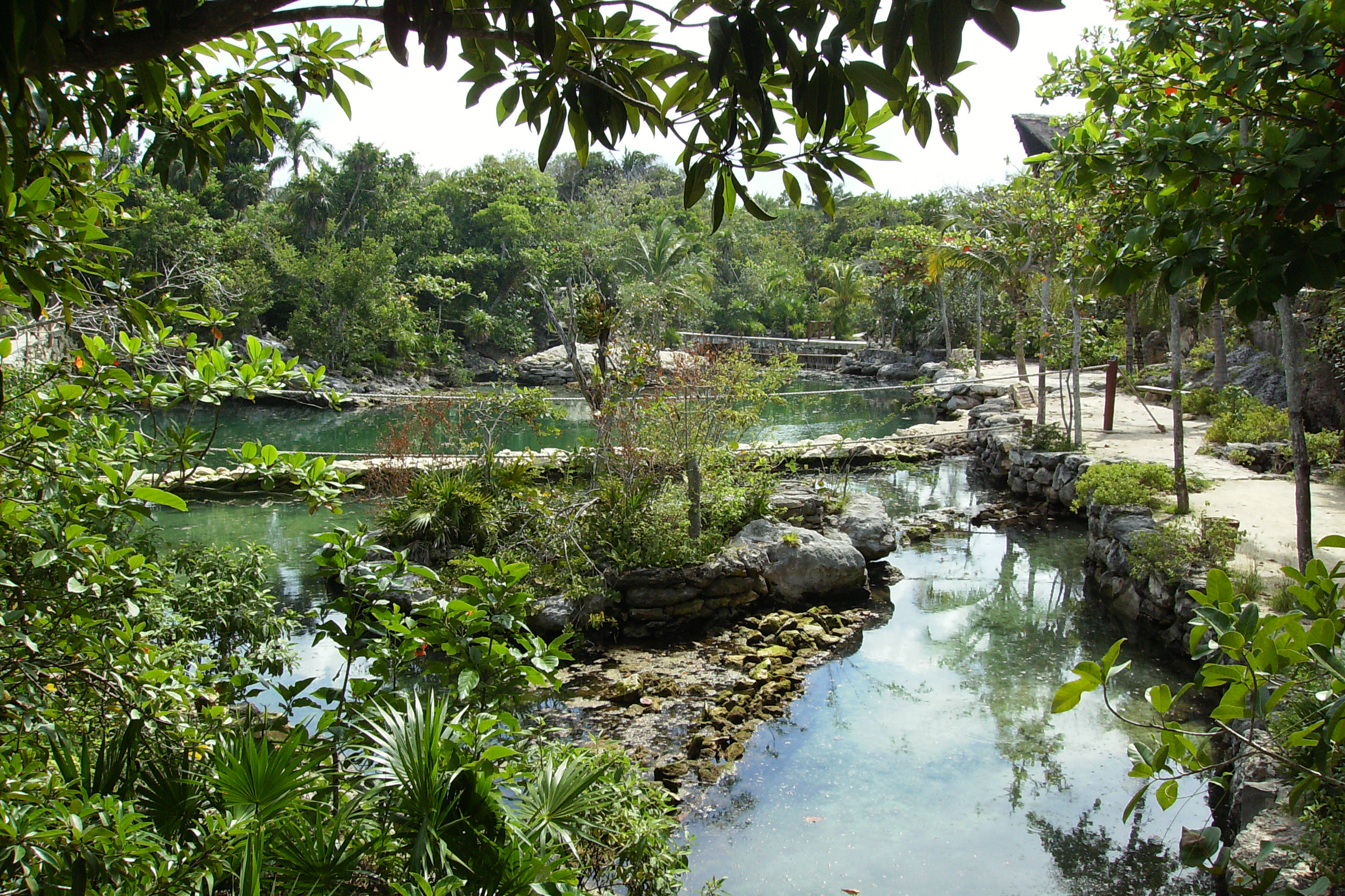
Xcaret pond

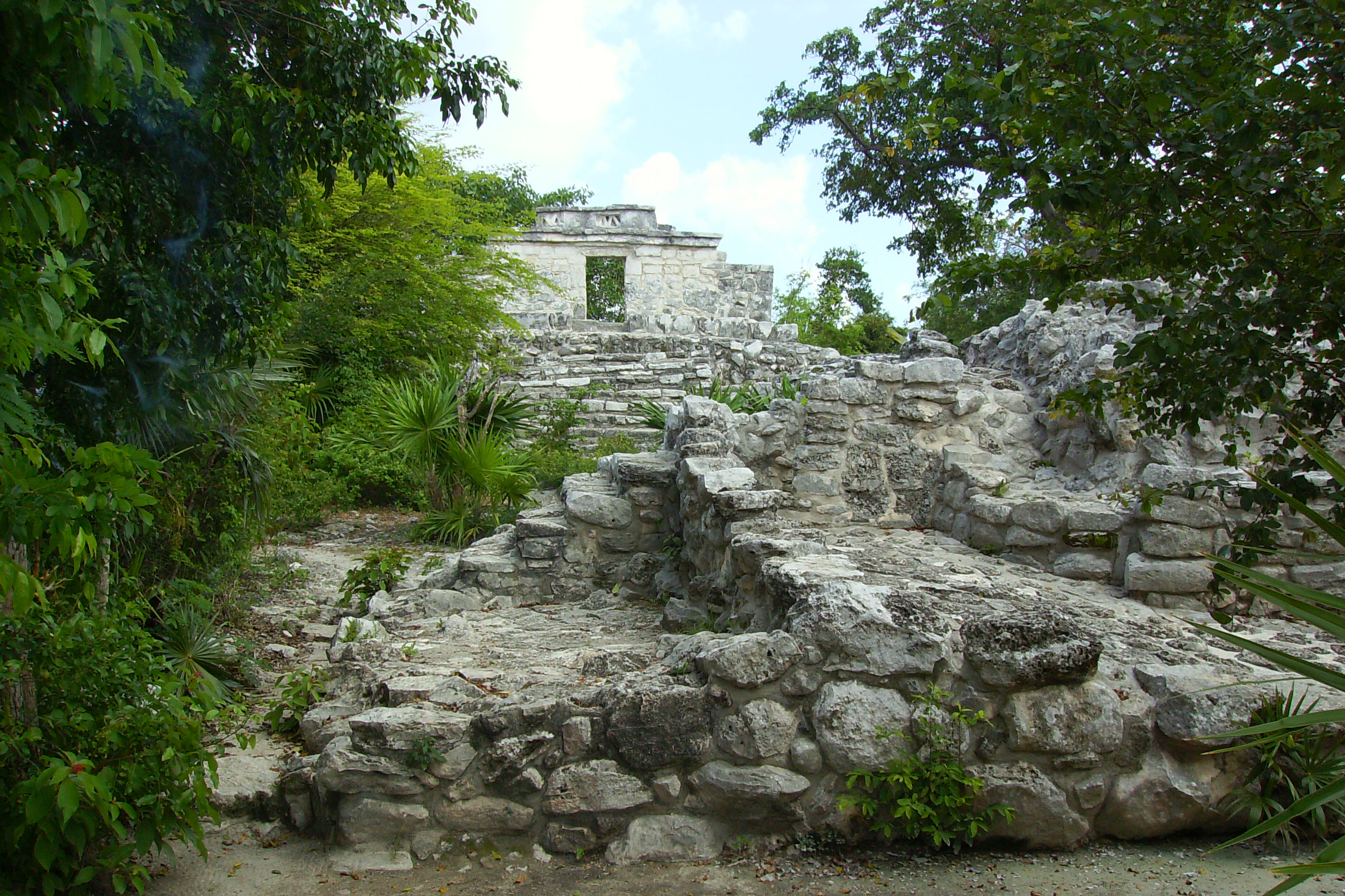
Mayan ruins in Xcaret

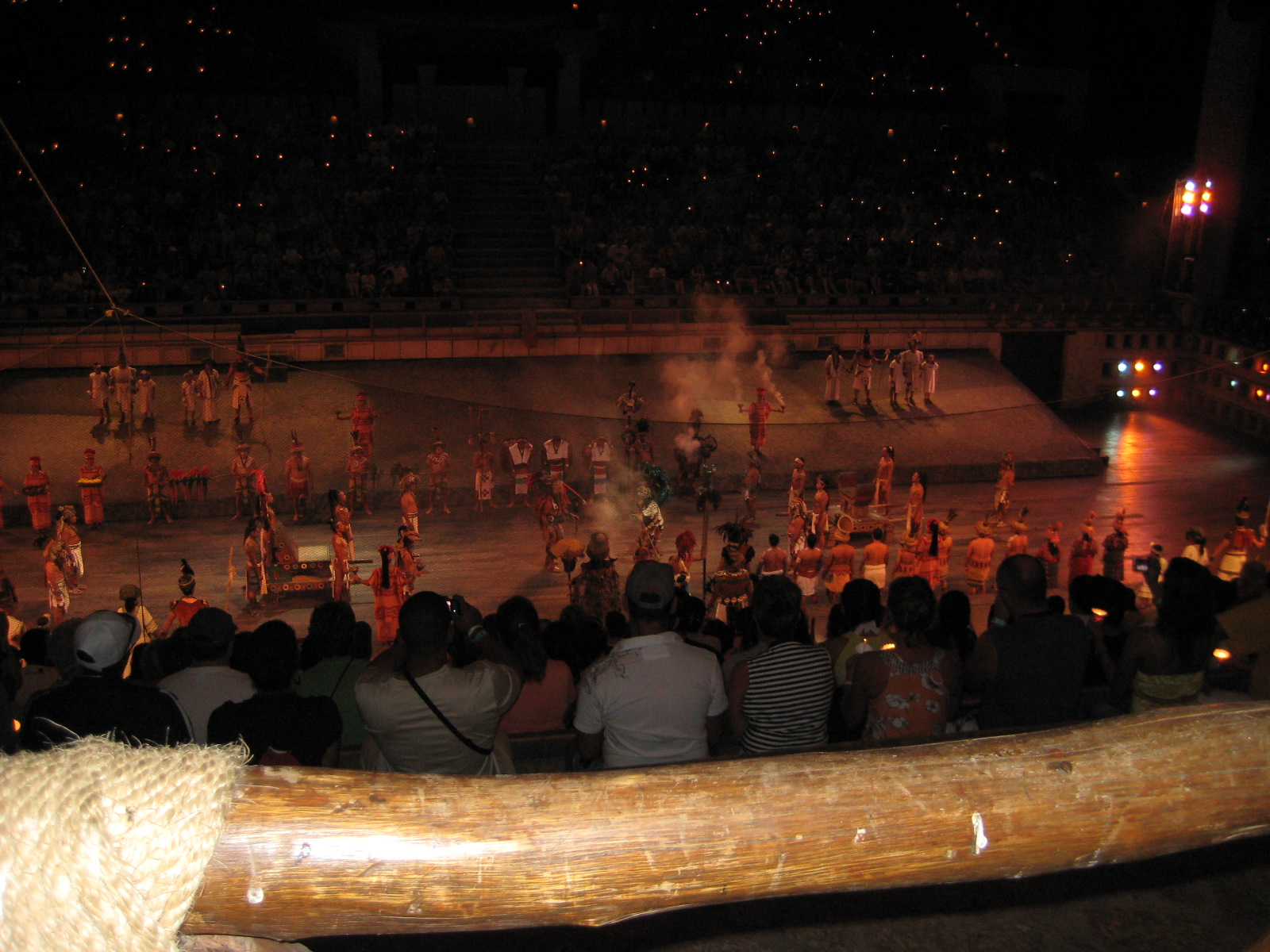
Xcaret Mexico Spectacular

The Ecological Park is built in the same area as the archaeological site and has the same name, Xcaret.

The land was originally purchased by a group of Mexican entrepreneurs, led by the Boston-born architect, Miguel Quintana Pali. Five hectares of land was purchased in 1984.

When he began to clear the land, he started uncovering cenotes, sinkholes formed by collapsed cave ceilings weakened by 3 million years of erosion from underground rivers running through them and flowing into the sea. He saw the potential for tourism and formulated the idea of an Ecological Park open to the public, and soon joined forces with Oscar, Marcos and Carlos Constandse, achieving this goal in December 1990.

At the same time, contact was established with the National Institute of Anthropology and History (Instituto Nacional de Antropología e Historia, INAH) with the objective of rebuilding the remnants of the Mayan pyramids and buildings that were found in the area. The park's administration subsidized all the operation and the INAH put in charge a team of specialists.

== Attractions ==
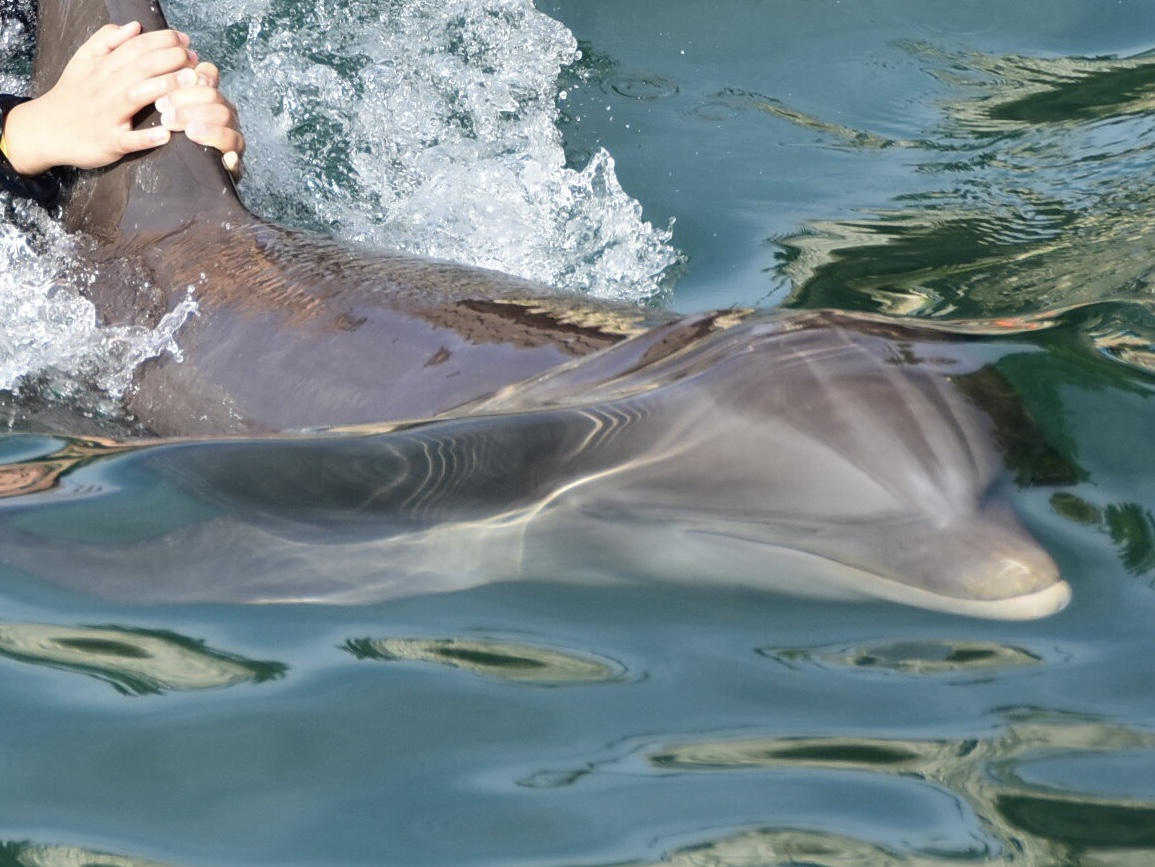
Swimming with dolphins at Xcaret Park

The nature-based attractions of the park include a river that goes through the Mayan village, a subterranean concrete sluice in which people can swim and snorkel with a life vest. Near the inlet there are recreational activities at the beach, snorkeling, Sea Trek and Snuba in the nearby reefs, or swimming with dolphins. The park also has a coral reef aquarium turtle nesting site. Next to the inlet there's an area for manatees. The park also has a bird pavilion, butterfly pavilion, bat cave, orchids and bromeliad greenhouse, an island of jaguars, and a deer shelter, among others.

The cultural attractions include an open church, replica of a Mayan village with real artisans at work, a Mexican cemetery, a museum, an equestrian show, Mesoamerican ball game, an open theater with performances of pre-Hispanic dances, Papantla flying men and the Gran Tlachco (a theater with a capacity of 6000 people) where the Mesoamerican ball game is represented, as well as the meeting of two worlds, the Mayan and the Spanish, and the presentation of several Mexican folklore dances. Other demonstrations of Mexican traditions include Day of the Dead celebration and the "Travesía Sagrada Maya" (Mayan Sacred Crossing), an annual rite when Mayans would cross the sea from Xcaret and Playa del Carmen to Cozumel to pay homage to the lunar goddess Ix Chel. The modern version is a re-creation of this rite done in late May to early June.

The park also has a temazcal and spa, has 11 restaurants, dressing rooms, souvenirs and handicrafts stores, as well as adjacent all-inclusive resort hotels.

== Hotels ==
The Xcaret resort currently has 3 hotels. Hotel Xcaret México was opened in December 2017. Hotel Xcaret Arte opened in 2021. La Casa de la Playa by Xcaret, a boutique hotel, opened at the park in December 2022. As part of the expansion of Xcaret's hotel division, the expansion of Hotel Xcaret México opened to the public in June 2025.

== Performances ==
Xcaret has different performances throughout the day in different areas of the park. The Charreria show is located outside of La Cocina Restaurant, and which has performances by charros, Adelitas and a parade of Aztec Horses. The Duration of this show is 20 minutes and it is subject to park operations and seasonal requirements. The Papantla Flyers ritual ceremony is located outside of Xcaret Plus facilities. This show is 25 minutes long and it is shown four times a day. Pre-Hispanic performances take place in The Mayan Village and it is also 25 minutes long. The 2-hour Xcaret México Espectacular show is the biggest show in the park, with more than 300 performers. The show is located in the Gran Tlachco Theater and it is the last show of the day.

== See also ==
- Xel-Ha Park
