= Xel-Ha Park =

Theme park in Quintana Roo, Mexico

Xel Há park Parque Xel-Há
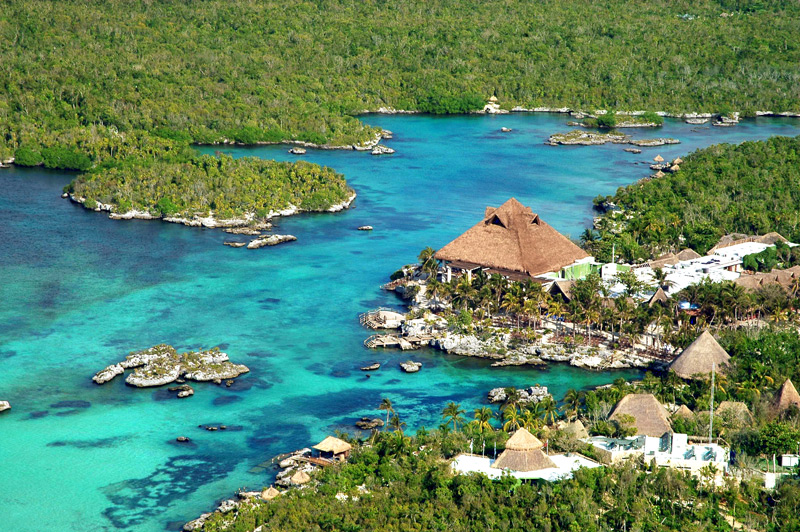
- Xel-Há Inlet
- Interactive map of Xel Há park Parque Xel-Há
- Location: Km. 240 Carretera Chetumal-Puerto Juárez local 1 y 2 módulo B, Quintana Roo, Mexico
- Coordinates: 20°19′2.22″N 87°21′24.55″W
- Owner: Promotora Xel-Ha S.A. de C.V. (subsidiary of Experiencias Xcaret Group)
- Website: http://www.xelha.com/

Xel-Ha Park (Mayan languages: Xel-Ha, Xel-Há in Spanish) is a commercial aquatic theme park and ecotourism development located on the Caribbean coast of the state of Quintana Roo, Mexico, within the municipality of Tulum. It is part of Xcaret Experiencias Group which also owns the Xplor Park, Xcaret Park, and Xenses Park; as well as the Xichen, Xenotes, Xavage, and Xoximilco tours and activities. It is situated within the "Riviera Maya", a region promoted as a tourism corridor along Highway 307. It is approximately 240 kilometres (149 mi) to the north of Chetumal, and 122 kilometres (76 mi) south of Cancun. The park is named after the site of Xelha, an archaeological site of the pre-Columbian Maya civilization, part of which is located within the lands leased to the park. The Maya site of Tulum is nearby, some 13 kilometres (8.1 mi) to the south.

From 2010 to 2015, Experiencias Xcaret has been recognized as one of The Best Mexican Companies (Las Mejores Empresas Mexicanas), a recognition promoted by Banamex, Deloitte México, and Tecnológico de Monterrey.

== History ==
The theme park was founded in 1984, and is under the management and marketing of the Mexican-owned Experiencias Xcaret Group.

The park is centered around the natural inlet and lagoon, which is promoted as one of the main attractions of the park that forms with the flow of the river through rocks mixing salty waters with fresh underground water currents.

The inlet of Xel-Há is a natural aquarium inhabited by hundreds of species: such as tropical fish and an abundant flora. The park also includes a turtle reserve, where research is constantly carried out to learn more about marine life and contribute to the ecological maintenance of the area.

A shark fence extends across the lagoon's entrance, and the public is permitted to swim and snorkel in the lagoon. Beneath the surface, the limestone has eroded into a myriad of small caves and grottos.

A variety of aquatic-based activities are offered by the theme park, including snorkelling, scuba diving, and swimming with dolphins.

== Sustainability ==
In early 2014, Xel-Há became the first tourist park in the world to obtain an EarthCheck Gold certification, in part because the park invests in sustainability programs, buys local products, and trains its staff in environmental care and preservation.

Additionally, Xel-Há excels in habitat conservation. Xel-Há retains 75% of its habitat through the Rescue, Reproduction and Reforestation of Native Plants Program, started in 2000. The nurseries at Xel-Há helped contribute to a massive reforestation effort by parent company Experiencias Xcaret Group, who planted more than 400,000 plants in 18 months. Nearly half the new plants were placed in public areas throughout Cancun and the Riviera Maya.

== See also ==
- Xcaret Eco Park
