= Xcaret =

Maya civilization archaeological site

Coordinates: 20°34′41″N 87°07′09″W

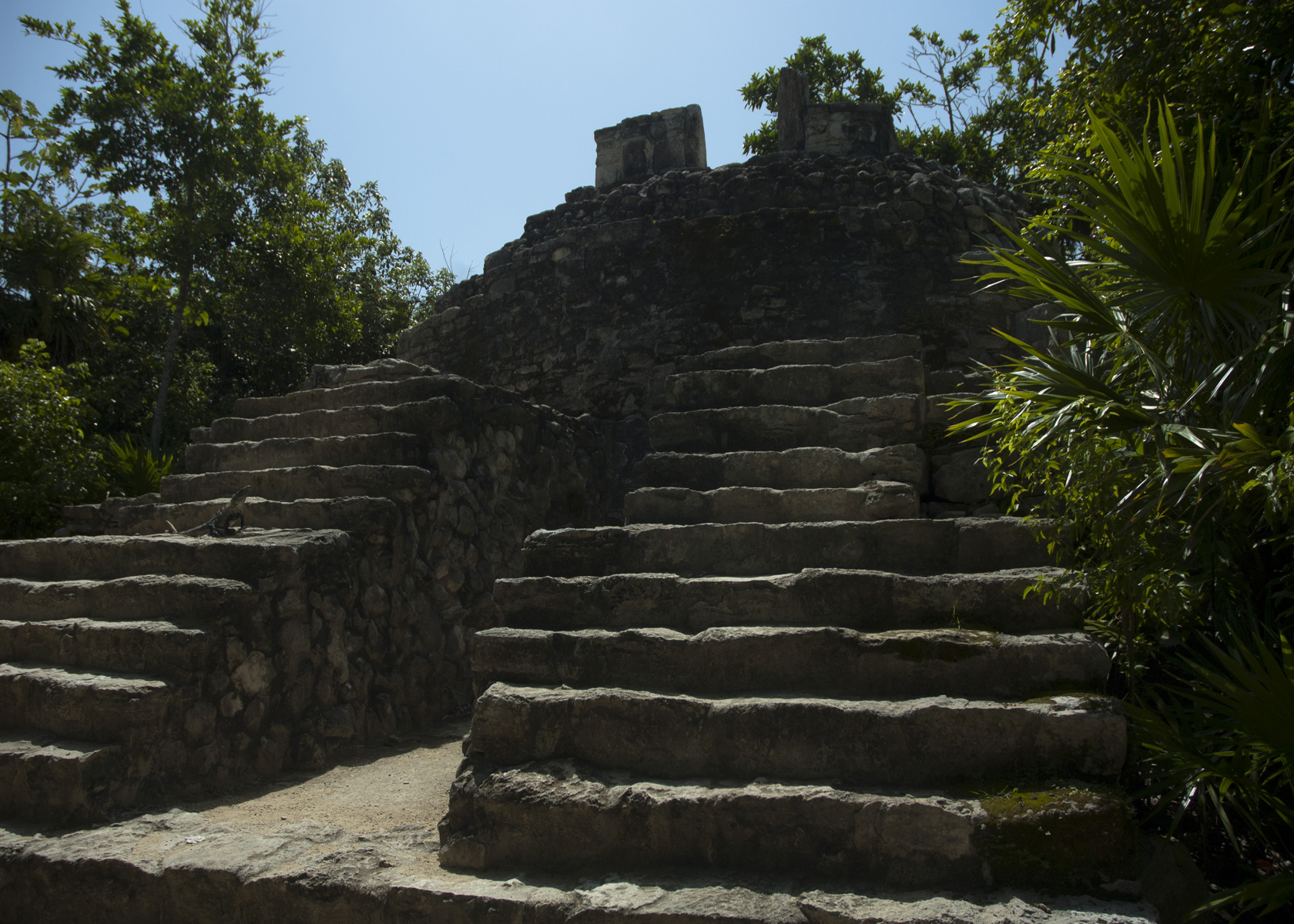
Remains of a Mayan pyramid in Xcaret

Xcaret (Mayan pronunciation: [ʃkaˈɾet]) is a Maya civilization archaeological site located on the Caribbean coastline of the Yucatán Peninsula, in the state of Quintana Roo in Mexico. The site was occupied by the pre-Columbian Maya and functioned as a port for navigation and an important Maya trading center. Some of the site's original structures are contained within a modern-day tourism development, the privately owned Xcaret Park.

== Toponymy ==
Xcaret means "small inlet" in Mayan. Its name comes from its situation next to a small inlet that in the past served as a strategic location for navigation and commerce for the Maya. The original name of the site was p'ole', from the root p'ol that means "merchandise" or "deal of merchants", which gives an idea of the economical relevance of the site.

== Site description ==
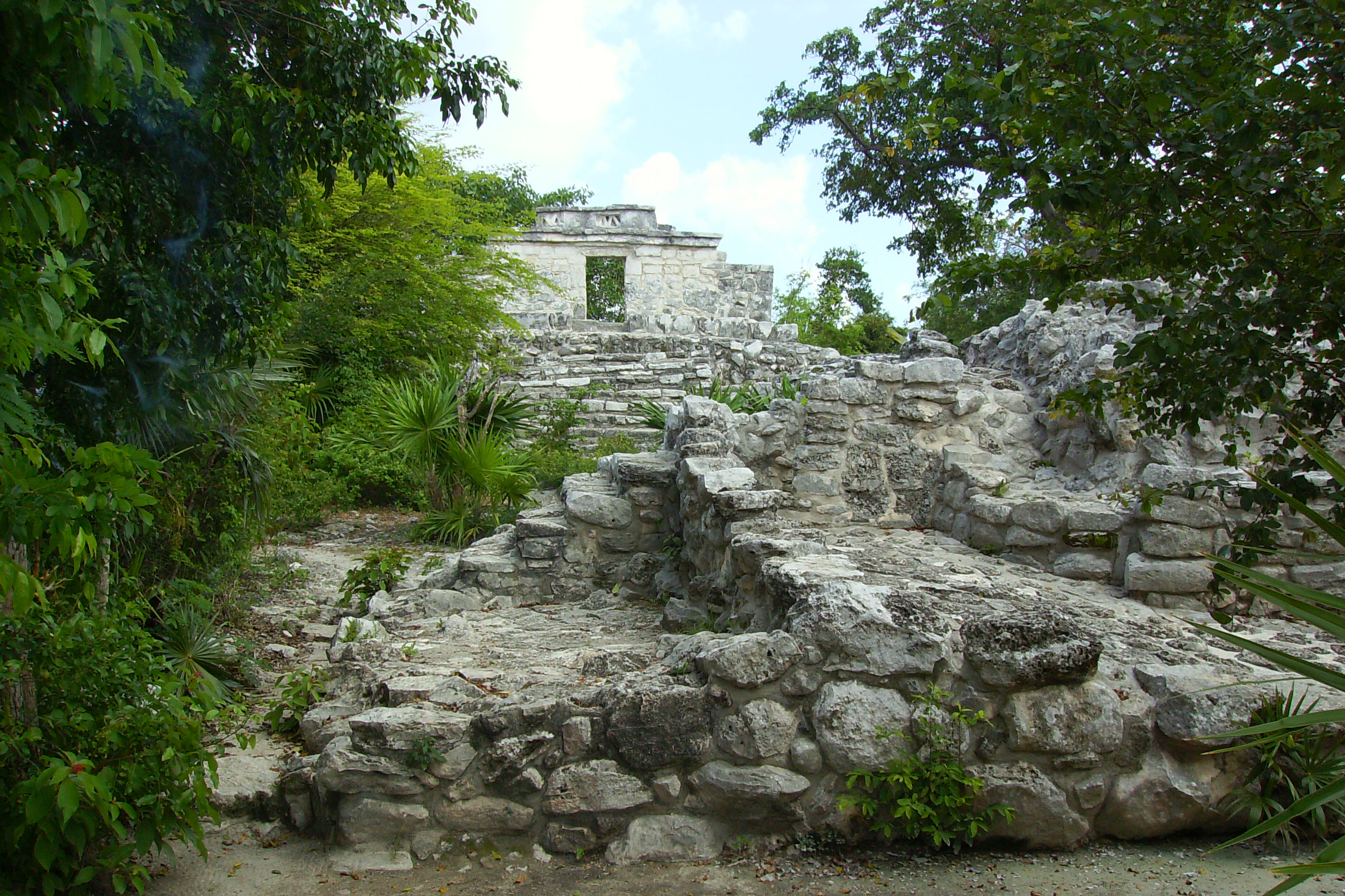
Mayan ruins in Xcaret

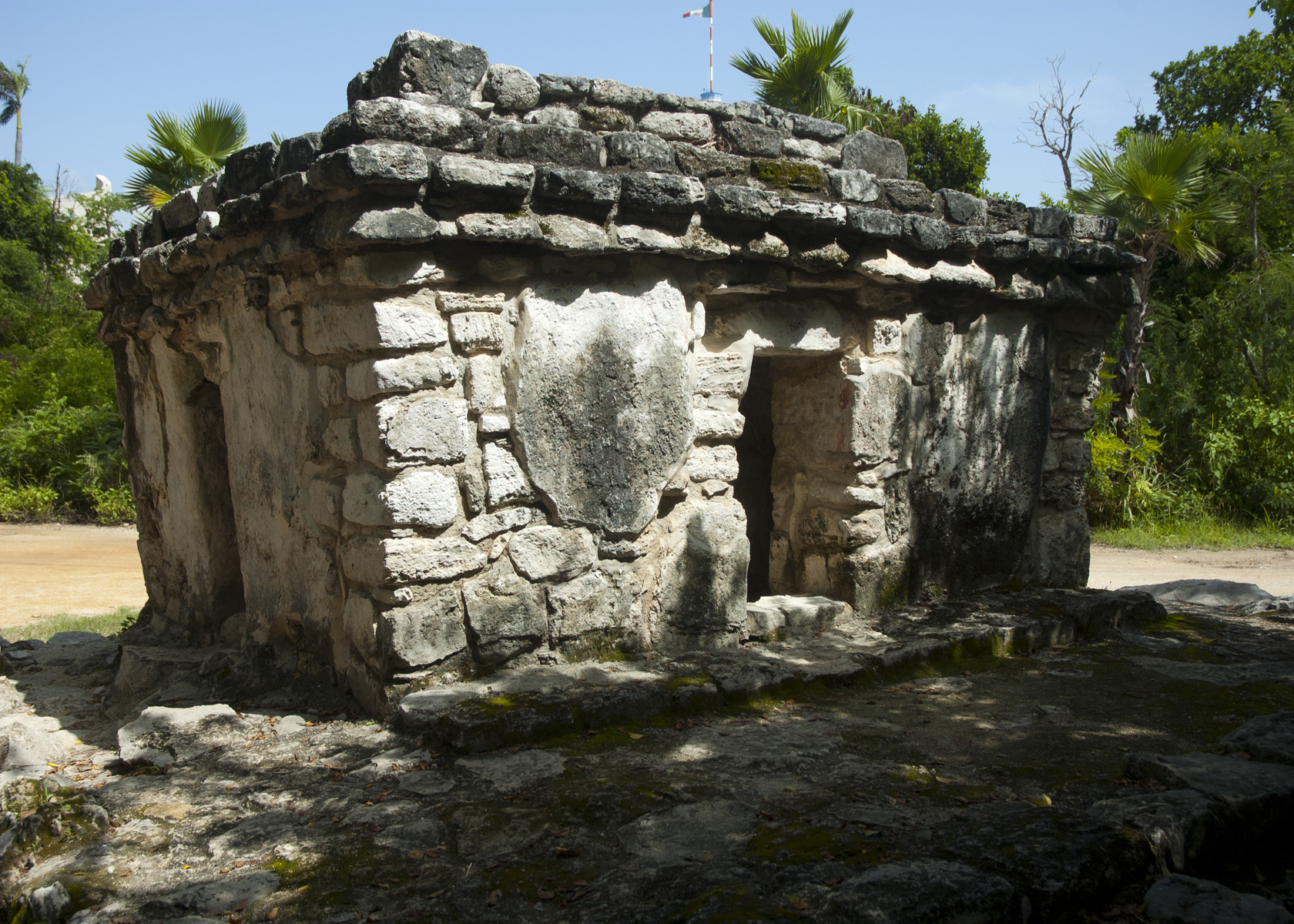
Part of the remains that the park preserves

Xcaret has many reserves that are open to the public. According to the research by the National Institute of Anthropology and History (INAH), the first buildings of the site can be dated to 200 to 600 A.D., but the majority of them are from the period from 1200 to 1550 A.D. The constructions of the Late Post-Classical period are situated along the coast; some of them in strategic positions for surveillance. The site had a wall, but unlike the one in Tulum that was open towards the ocean, the wall at Xcaret defended the site from assaults coming from the sea. The wall may also have served to divide the solid ground of the interior from the swampy ground closer to the coast.

Xcaret was inhabited at the time of the first stage of the Spanish incursion of Alonso Dávila and Francisco de Montejo into the eastern coast of the Yucatán Peninsula (1527 to 1529). In 1548, Juan Núñez was put in charge of Xcaret. At this time, a Spanish chapel was built. This implies that Xcaret remained an important settlement. The thatched roof of the chapel has disintegrated, but the walls remain standing. The INAH divides the architectural formations into several different groups.

== Historical significance ==
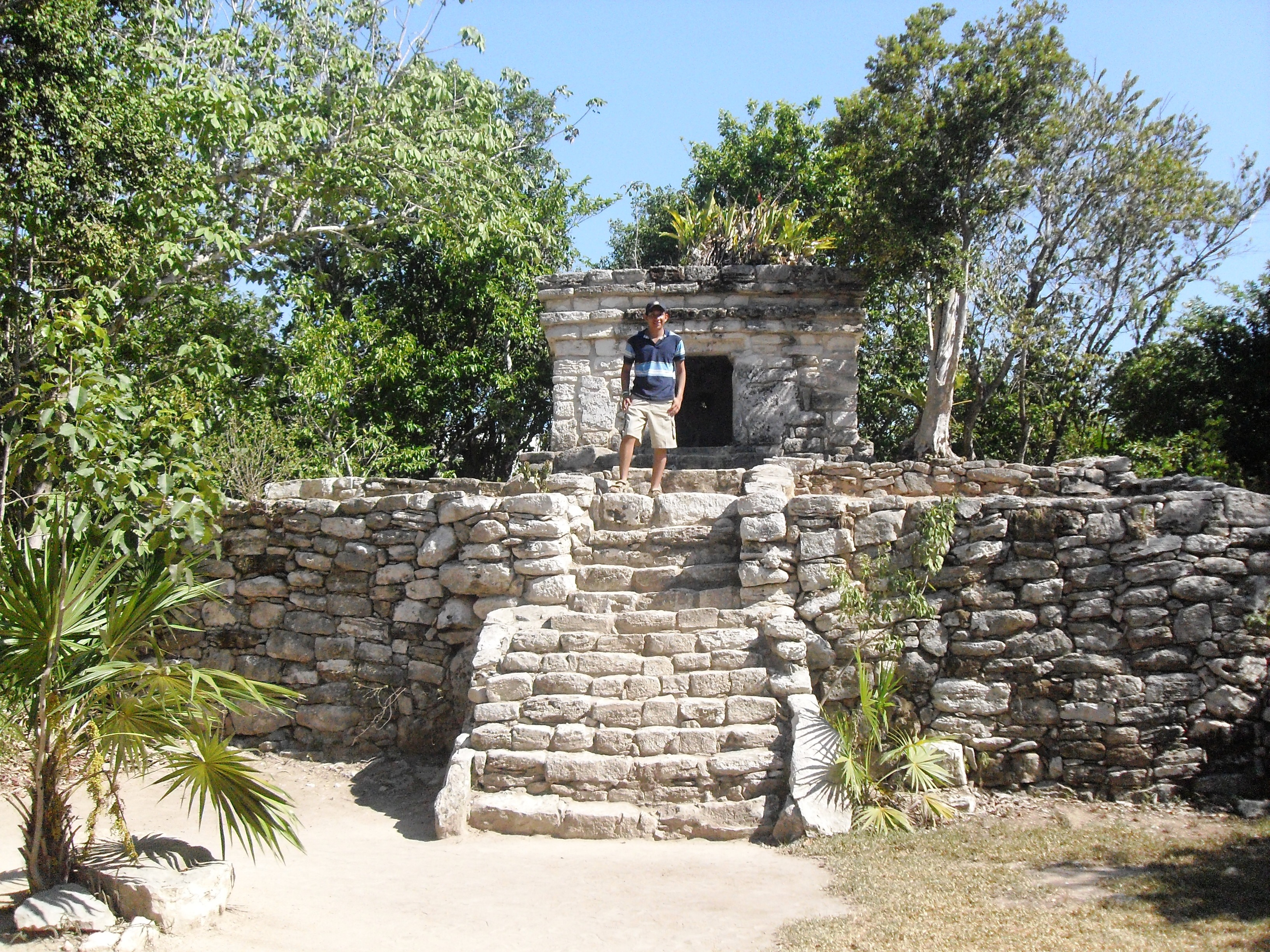
Zone Arqueologica of Xcaret

There are documents which suggest that Xcaret was one of the most active and economically significant Maya ports on the east coast. These documents make mention of marriages between the P'ole rulers and the people of Cozumel. These marriages were likely for political advances; they imply that Xcaret was politically important.

== Archaeological finds ==
During archaeological explorations led by archaeologist María José, 135 human remains were found in the chapel. In another case, DNA found on site was analyzed, and results showed that "the distribution of mtDNA lineages in the Xcaret population contrasts sharply with that found in ancient Maya from Copán, which lack lineages A and B. On the other hand, our results resemble more closely the frequencies of mtDNA lineages found in contemporary Maya from the Yucatán Peninsula and in other Native American contemporary populations of Mesoamerican origin." These findings suggest that the people of Xcaret are more closely related to contemporary Maya peoples than ancient peoples.
