= Xelha =

Maya civilization archaeological site

Xel-Há
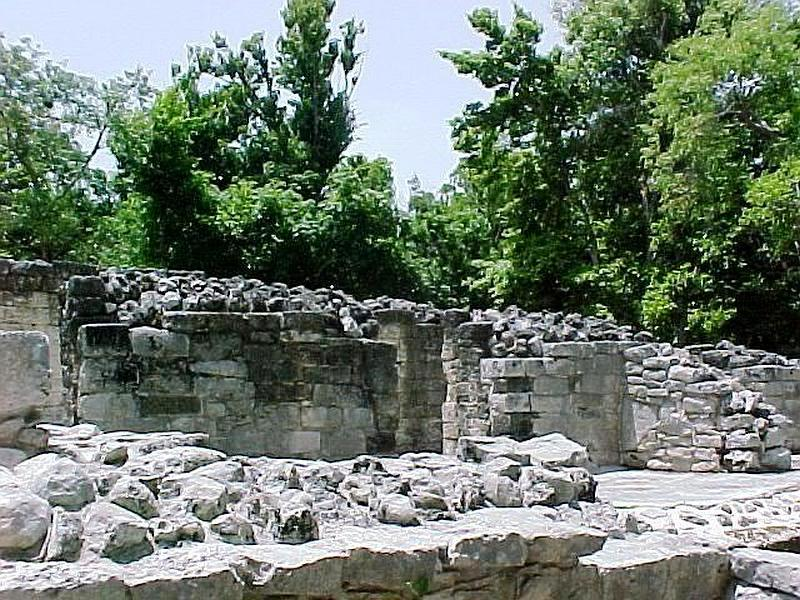
- Ruins at Xel-Há
- Interactive map of Xel-Há
- 20°19′11″N 87°22′01″W
- Type: settlement
- Cultures: Mayan
- Location: Quintana Roo, Mexico
- Region: Yucatán Peninsula

History
- Built: pre 1st century
- Abandoned: 19th century

Site notes
- Material: limestone, stucco

Xelha (Spanish pronunciation: [ʃelˈxa], Spanish: Xelhá; Yucatec Maya: Xel-Há) is an archaeological site of the Maya civilization from pre-Columbian Mesoamerica, located on the eastern coastline of the Yucatán Peninsula, in the present-day state of Quintana Roo, Mexico. The etymology of the site's name comes from Yukatek Maya, combining the roots xel ("spring") and ha' ("water").

The lagoon and inlet at Xelha has been turned into a commercial water theme park known as Xel-Ha Park.

== History ==
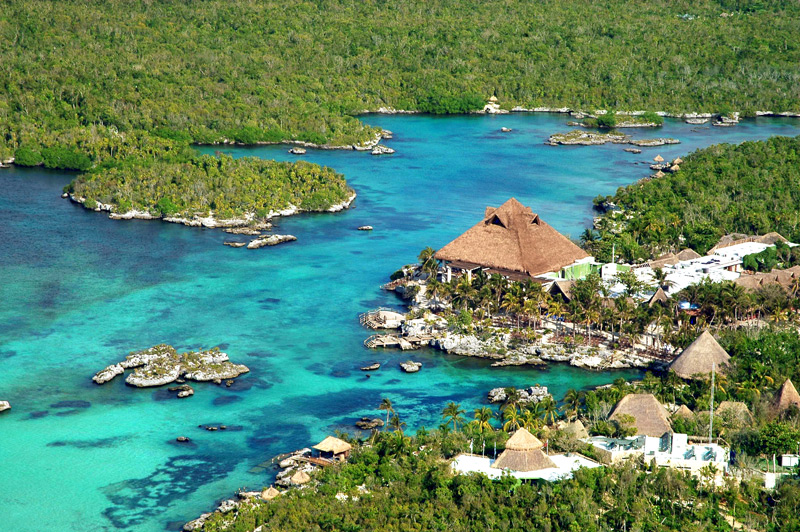
The beach of Xel-Há

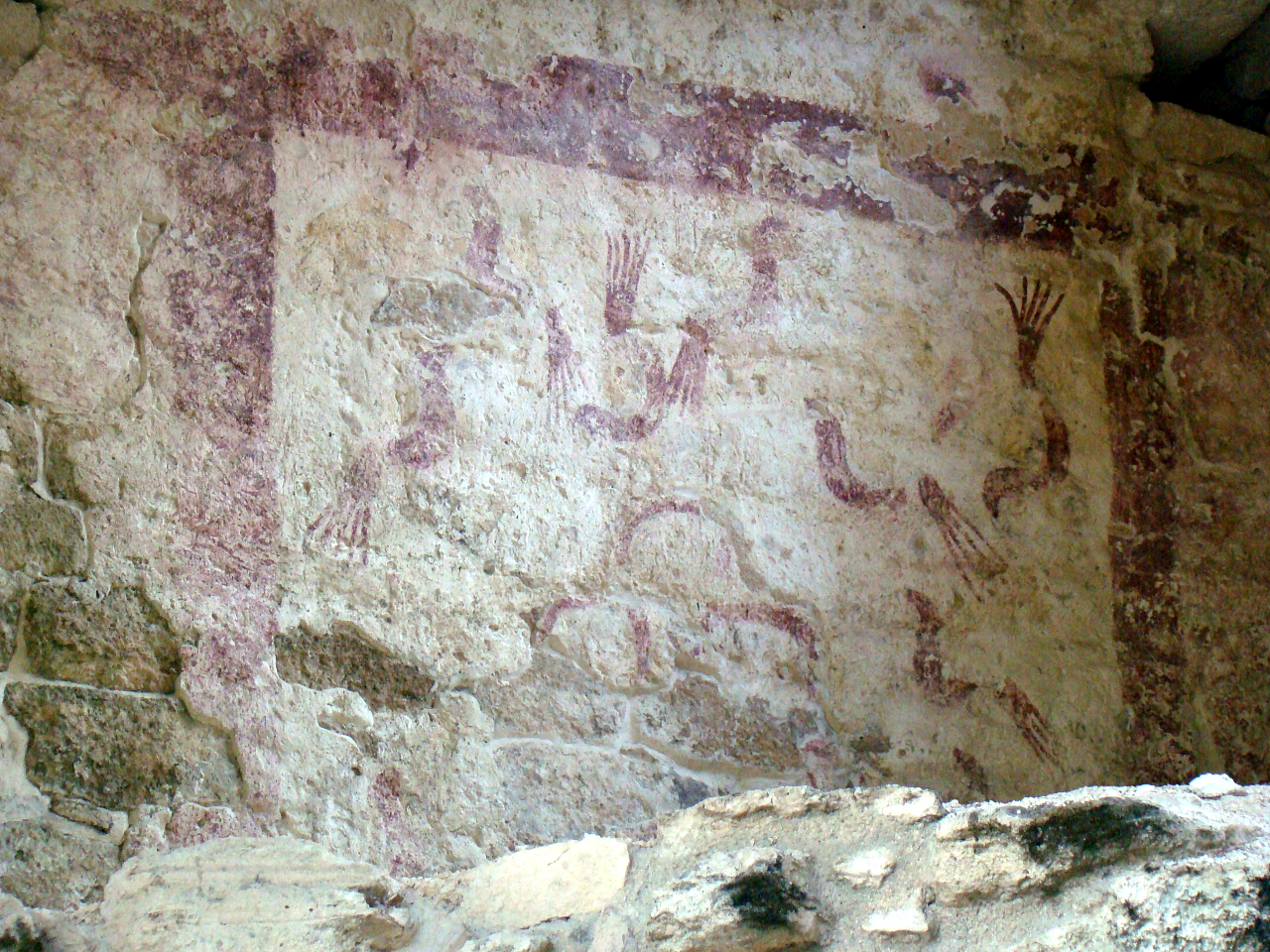
"House of Birds" in Xelha. Mural Paintings.

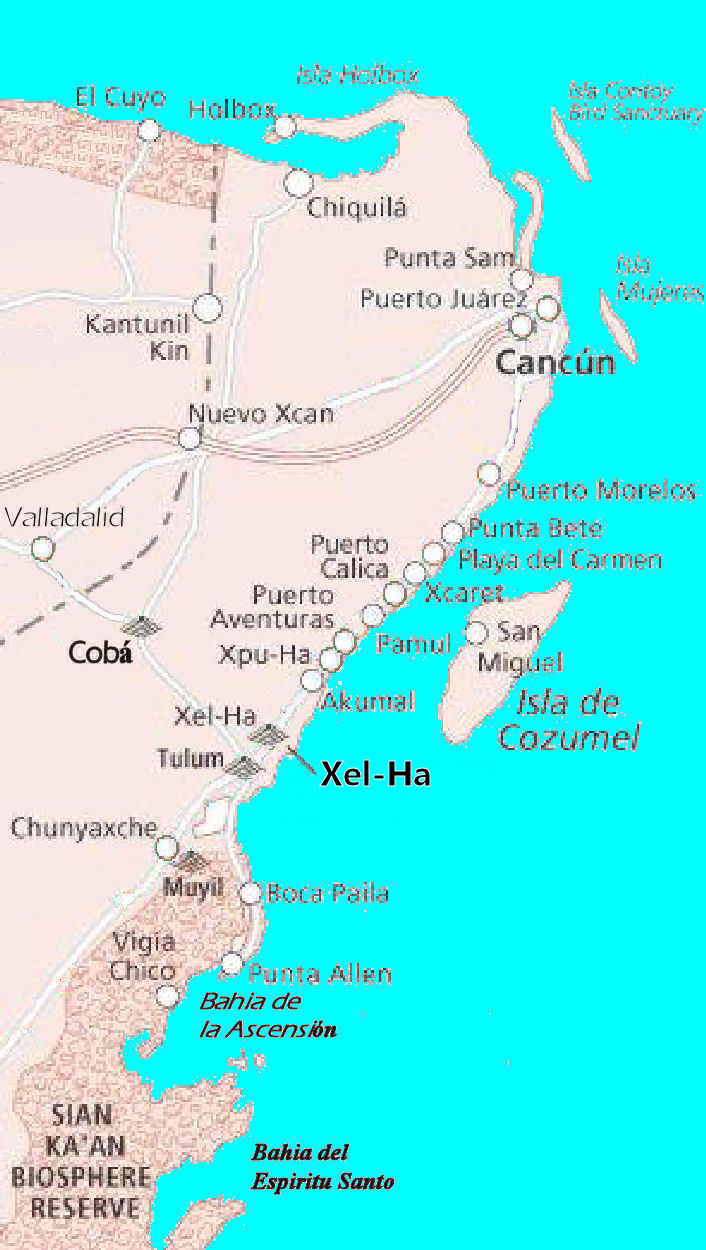
Northern Quintana Roo, Mexico

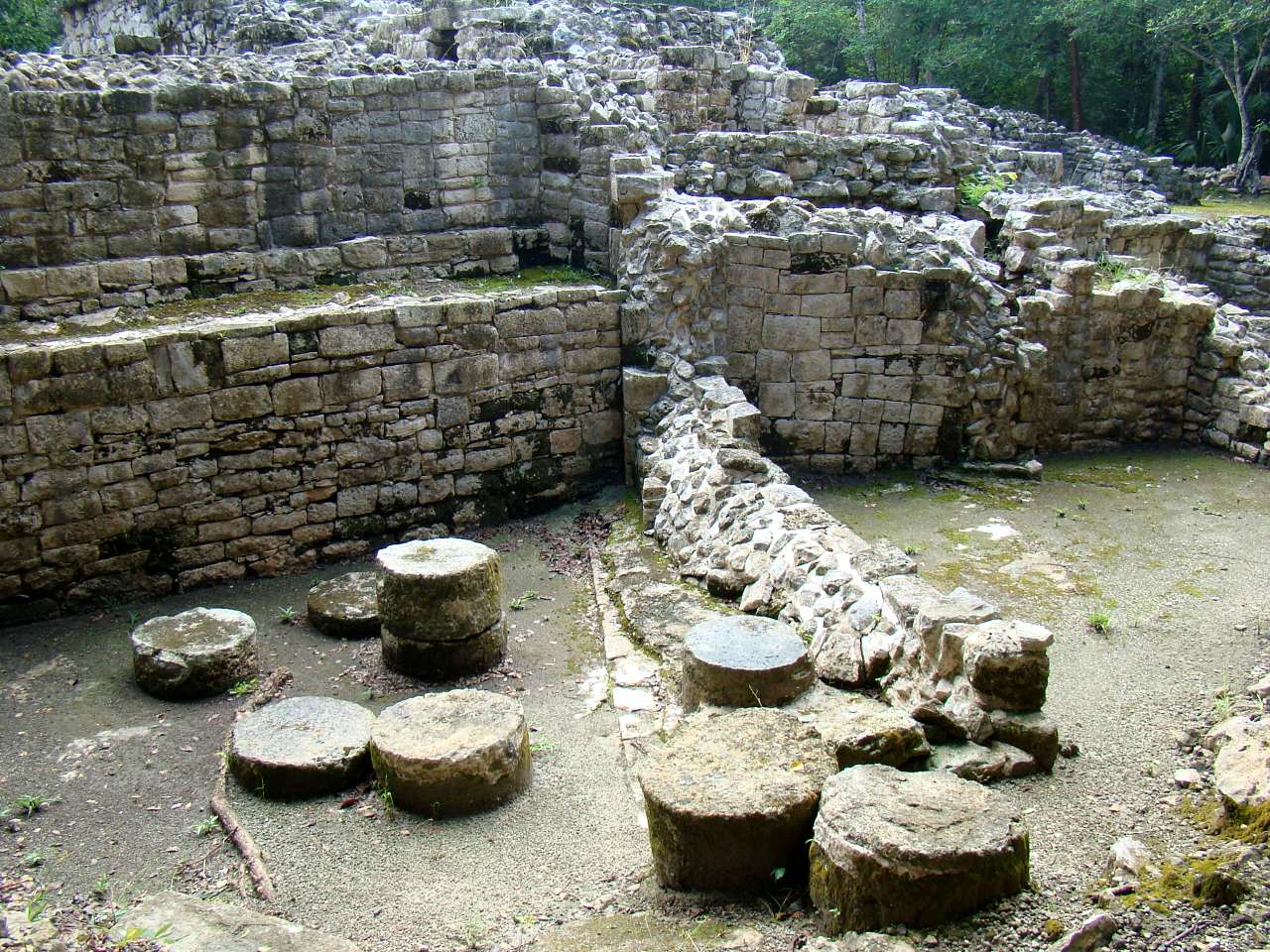
"Palace" in Xelha. Columns.

The site of Xelha is located south of the modern township of Playa del Carmen, in the state of Quintana Roo, Mexico.

The evidence is inconclusive concerning a founding date for Xel-Ha, but it was occupied by the 1st century and active during Classic and Postclassic times, with most of the buildings being rebuilt in the Late Postclassic. It was probably not fully abandoned until the 19th century. A stela with an Early Classic date of 9.6.10.0.0 (AD 564) from Xel-Ha was discovered in 1841 by Stephens and Catherwood.

Xelha was one of several key ports of the Maya city of Coba; others included Tancah and Tulum. It was likely used as a point of intercultural exchange between the Maya and other sea-navigating peoples between the 7th and 12th centuries, and eventually was a beacon to which European colonial navigators were drawn.

The location of Xelha was used as a base by Spanish forces, during the ultimately unsuccessful first expedition (1527–28) led by the conquistador Francisco de Montejo (the Elder). Montejo, who had obtained a charter from the Spanish Crown in 1526 to pacify the Yucatán Peninsula, crossed over from the island of Cozumel to make landfall at Xelha's lagoons, a short distance from a local Maya village. He set about establishing what was intended to be the first Spanish settlement on the peninsula, which he named "Salamanca de Xelha" after his birthplace in western Spain, Salamanca. However, the supplies he had brought soon proved inadequate to the task of sustaining the venture. Despite attempts to commandeer and raid neighboring Maya settlements for food, his fledgling settlement lost some fifty men within the first two months to disease and privation. In an action reminiscent of Hernán Cortés, Montejo ordered the scuttling of his ships in the face of growing discontent, forcing them to remain.

Eventually Montejo's forces stabilised sufficiently for him to mount explorations from his temporary encampment, heading out with some 125 men north towards Ecab near Cape Catoche. The sortie returned several months later after losing half of his men in a battle against the Maya near Ake, and to disease. The 65 conquistadores who had been left behind at Salamanca de Xelha fared no better with many being massacred in Maya raids, leaving Montejo with only about a third of his original complement.

The fortuitous arrival at that point of another of his ships from Santo Domingo with provisions and reinforcements prevented further disaster, and an expedition was sent out to the south towards the Maya township of Chetumal. This also failed to gain any foothold, and within eighteen months of Montejo's first landfall in Yucatán, the encampment at Salamanca de Xelha and the eastern coast were abandoned.

== See also ==
- Montejo expedition – including 1527 founding of Salamanca
