= Swimming with dolphins =

Form of therapy or recreation for humans

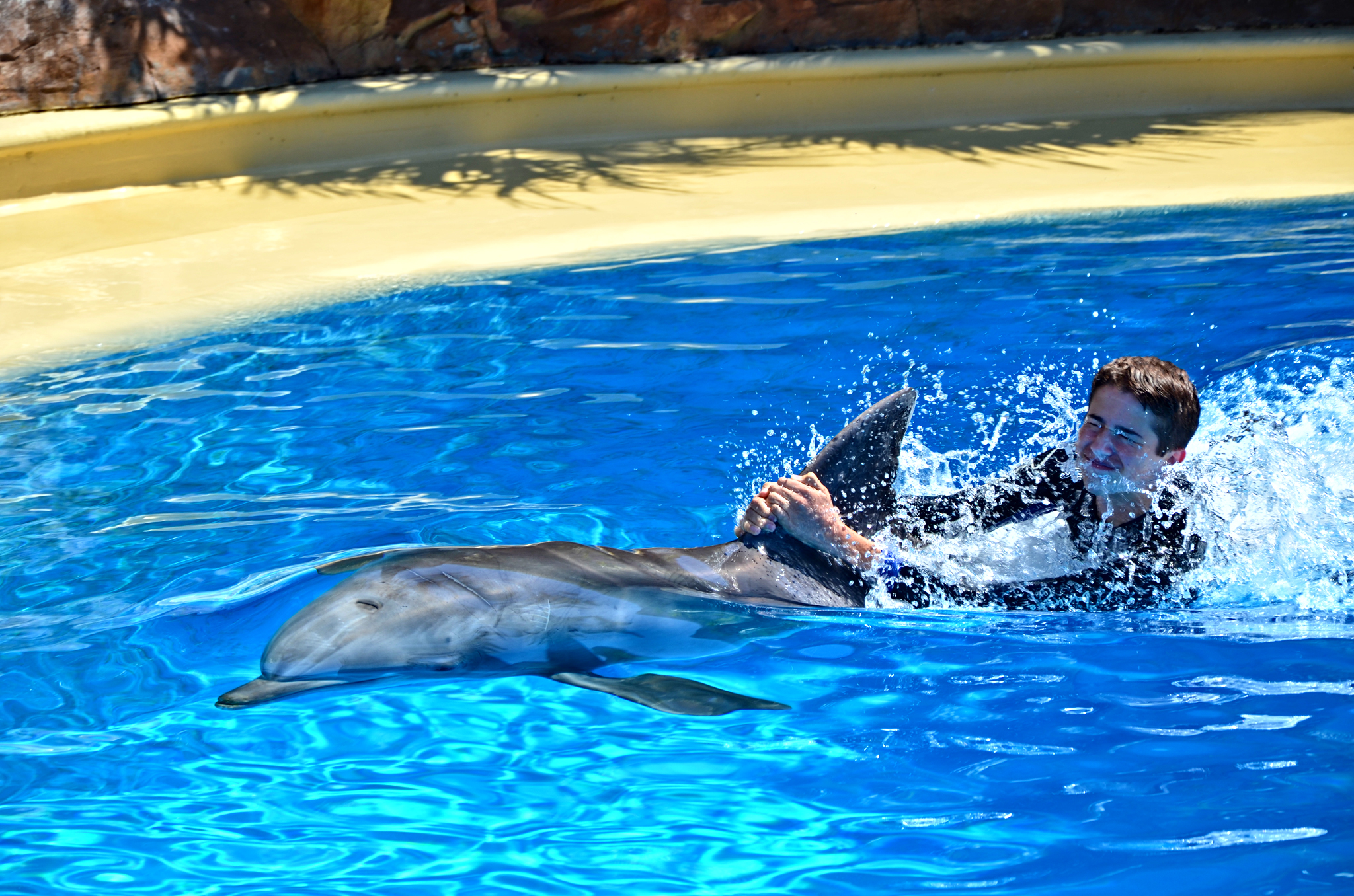
Human pulled along by captive dolphin

The popularity of swimming with dolphins increased in the 1980s and 1990s, occurring in over 65 countries, both as a form of therapy as well as a tourist activity. Proponents of dolphin-assisted therapy (DAT) say that interacting with dolphins can help to treat mental and physical disorders in humans, but there is limited clinical evidence proving its benefits. Marine parks and other tourist destinations offering "swim-with-dolphin" experiences have also promoted the purported healing attributes of dolphins. Opponents argue that interactions between humans and dolphins have had a negative impact on dolphin populations both in the wild and in captivity, and that the practice can be dangerous for humans. Concerns over animal welfare have led to bans on swimming with dolphins in Costa Rica, as well as certain locations in New Zealand and Hawaii.

== Dolphin-assisted therapy ==
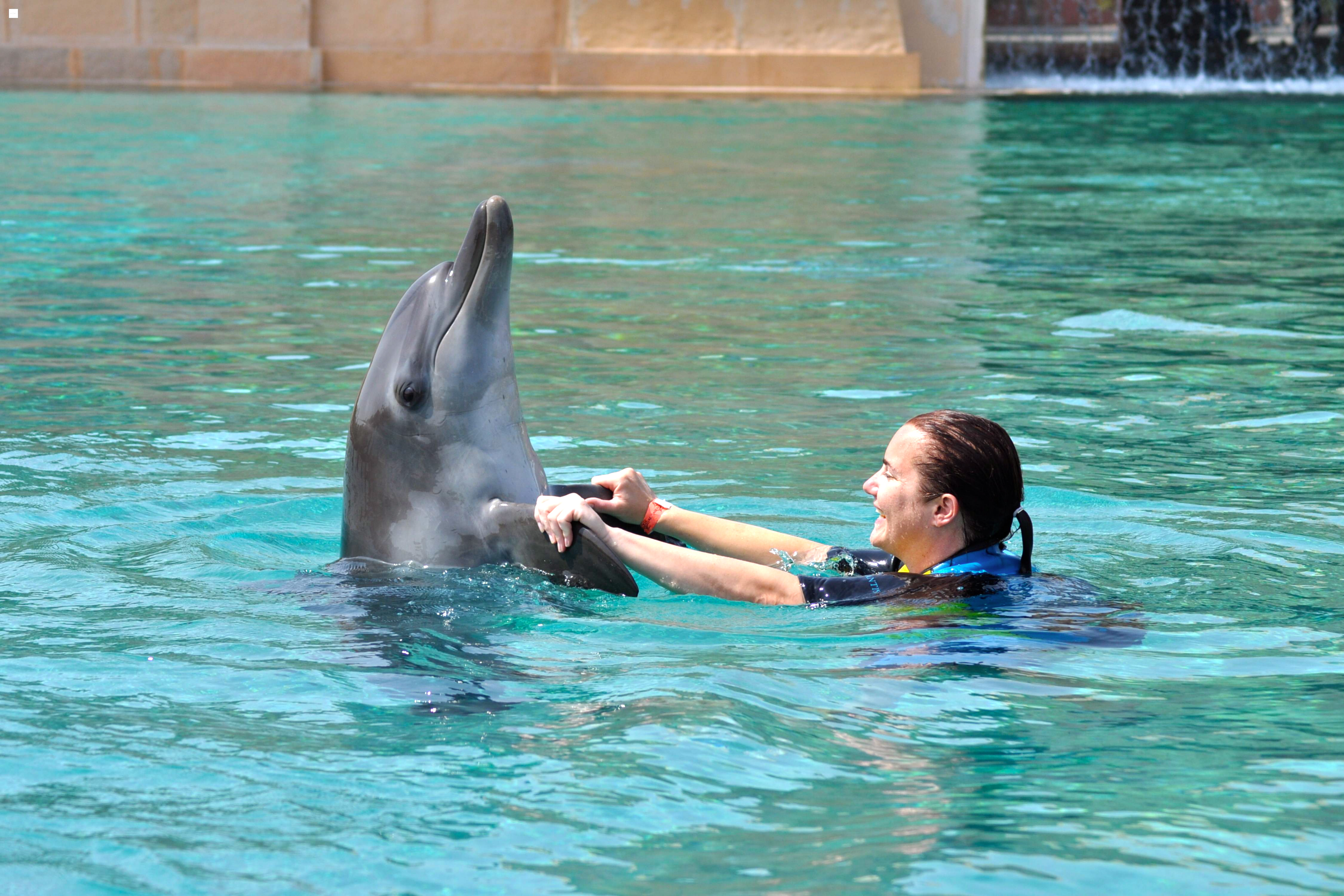
Human interacting with captive dolphin

=== Claims ===
Dolphin-assisted therapy (DAT) is a form of animal-assisted therapy (AAT), in which captive dolphins interact with humans with a range of psychological and neurological disorders. DAT is often claimed to help children and adults with autism, as well as other conditions including depression, cerebral palsy, encephalopathy, Down's syndrome, atopic dermatitis, muscular dystrophy, spinal cord injuries, and attention deficit hyperactivity disorder (ADHD).

While some forms of DAT involve patients swimming with, or being pulled around by, dolphins, others entail simply observing, touching, or feeding them. In general, it is a very expensive form of therapy, costing thousands of dollars in addition to the expense of travel and accommodations to the facilities, located in the United States and Mexico, as well as the Caribbean, South America, Middle East, and Europe. Critics have expressed concern that families are forgoing more effective, scientifically proven therapy and treatments order to be able to pay for DAT.

=== Origins ===
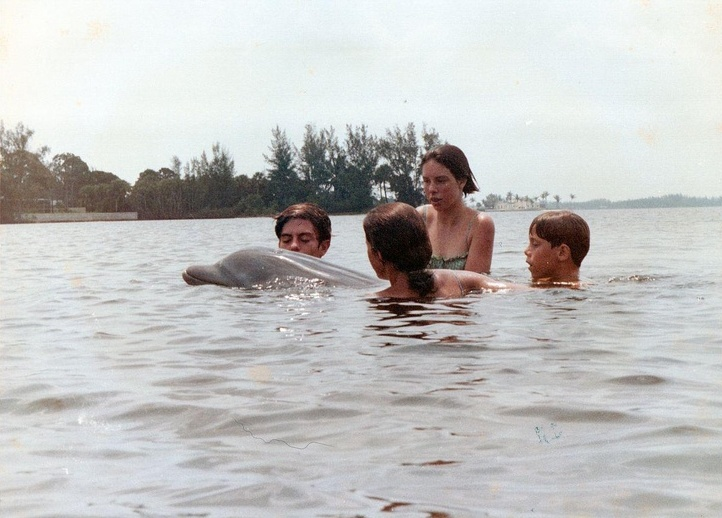
Encounter between a solitary wild dolphin and human children in 1967

Educational anthropologist Dr. Betsy Smith of Florida International University is usually credited with starting the first line of research into dolphin-assisted therapy in 1971, building on earlier research by American neuroscientist Dr. John Lilly on interspecies communication between dolphins and humans in the 1950s. Smith observed that two wild dolphins, adolescents who were normally aggressive, were surprisingly gentle around her mentally disabled brother, and that his mood and abilities had improved after playing with them. She offered DAT sessions for free, bringing groups of autistic children to Dolphins Plus in Key Largo to swim in the 1980s, and called for more rigorous scientific research into the possible long-term benefits of swimming with dolphins.

In 1978, Dr. David Nathanson, an American clinical psychologist born in Glasgow, started language experiments using swimming with dolphins as a motivator in teaching children with Down's Syndrome at Ocean World in Fort Lauderdale, Florida. Nathanson found that when children were rewarded with dolphin swims for giving correct responses, they learned four times faster and retained information for longer. From 1988 to 1994, he ran a Dolphin Research Center in Grassy Key, Florida, which proved popular with families who were willing to pay a considerable expense for the therapy; it was even said to have helped some severely disabled children regain speech. In 1995, he moved his Dolphin Human Therapy centre to Key Largo, offering services for disabilities including learning difficulties, brain and spinal cord injuries, blindness, deafness, and other sensory handicaps.

In 2003, Betsy Smith publicly renounced DAT, criticizing the fact that it had become driven by monetary gain rather than empirical evidence supporting its effectiveness, and argued that there is nothing unique about using dolphins specifically for the type of behavioral therapy carried out by Nathanson. Smith has stated that DAT programs are undermining valid treatments, and are "taking vulnerable children and vulnerable animals and profiting from them".

=== Theories ===
Possible explanations for why dolphin-assisted therapy works are usually vague, often using scientific terms incorrectly or out of context, and are generally unproven. One of the most popular theories is that when dolphins produce "clicks" as part of echolocation, they emit an ultrasound that stimulates the human endocrine and neural systems, helping to heal body tissue and cell structure. There is no scientific evidence supporting this. Dolphins used in DAT do not always echolocate on the patient, and the ultrasound emitted by dolphins is different from therapeutic ultrasound currently used by medical practitioners, which is applied repeatedly at a specific intensity and duration.

Another theory is that contact with dolphins has a calming effect and increases relaxation in humans. Analysis of patients' brain wave patterns using electroencephalography (EEG) scans have suggested that DAT produces a temporary "nonspecific relaxation effect", but it is unclear how this connects to therapeutic benefits for specific conditions such as autism spectrum disorders (ASD).

The theory promoted by Nathanson and his co-authors is that swimming with dolphins improves attention and responsiveness to external stimuli. In a major review of the literature through 2020, Lori Marino and Scott O. Lilienfeld point out that many of the patients in Nathanson's studies had neurological disorders such as cerebral palsy that are not linked to attention deficits. Even for patients with autism, they argue, "the minimal nature of the intervention of swimming with dolphins strains credulity as an adequate treatment for such a profound, complex, and lifelong disorder as ASD."

Still other theories have focused on the positive effects of biophilia, or human attraction to nature; a special emotional bond between dolphins and humans; or a "secret language" in which dolphins "communicate acoustically with body movements" and are sensitive to the movements of children with disabilities. Marino and Lilienfeld argue that these theories are nonspecific, and provide no scientifically plausible mechanism for the effectiveness of DAT in treating specific neurodevelopmental disorders.

=== Effectiveness ===
There are very few scientific articles in peer-reviewed journals examining the efficacy of DAT in treating autism or other conditions. Past studies have been found to have fundamental methodological flaws, such as the lack of control groups, small sample size, lack of randomization, selection bias, and the absence of reliability and validity measurements. Investigator bias has been a problem in studies conducted by Nathanson and others, because most individuals were involved aware of the anticipated or "desired" outcomes. Respondent bias has also been a problem in studies where children were selected to participate because their families expressed interested in DAT.

Likely interference of other treatments and the lack of experimental controls for other factors, such as the warmness of the water, or the novelty of having traveled by plane to a new location, are common problems across many studies. The novelty of dolphins, which most humans don't regularly interact with, is a likely influence on participant behavior as well. Lori Marino of Emory University has stated, "Dolphin-assisted therapy is not a valid treatment for any disorder", with no scientific evidence for long-term benefits, and that at best, it affords "fleeting improvements in mood".

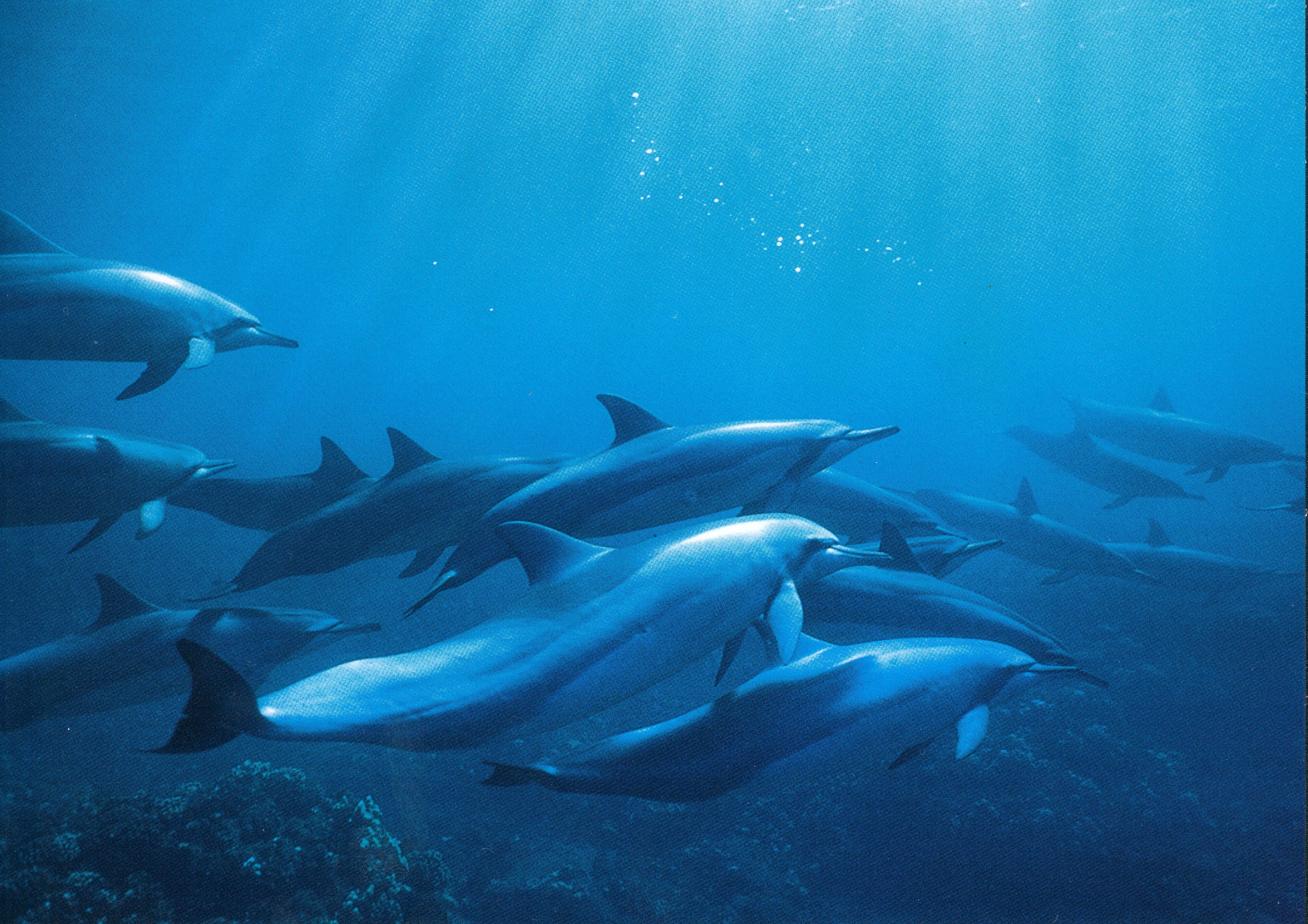
Wild spinner dolphins swimming underwater

There is limited clinical evidence that dolphin therapy is effective in treating depression. In 2005, psychiatrists from the University of Leicester published a report in the British Medical Journal on a study which found that patients with depression experienced significant improvements in mood after swimming and snorkelling with dolphins. During the two-week controlled trial in Honduras, 30 patients discontinued their medical and psychotherapy treatments and participated in water activities instead. Half the group swam and snorkelled alongside dolphins, while the control group swam and snorkelled only with each other. The researchers found that patients who swam with dolphins experienced "greater elevations of mood and longer-lasting effects" than those swimming without dolphins.

In recent years, interest has grown in virtual reality therapy which simulates swimming with dolphins underwater to reduce the impact of stress for patients with depression, anxiety and psychotic disorders, and other disabilities, and to ease pain for patients in hospital.

== Tourist activity ==
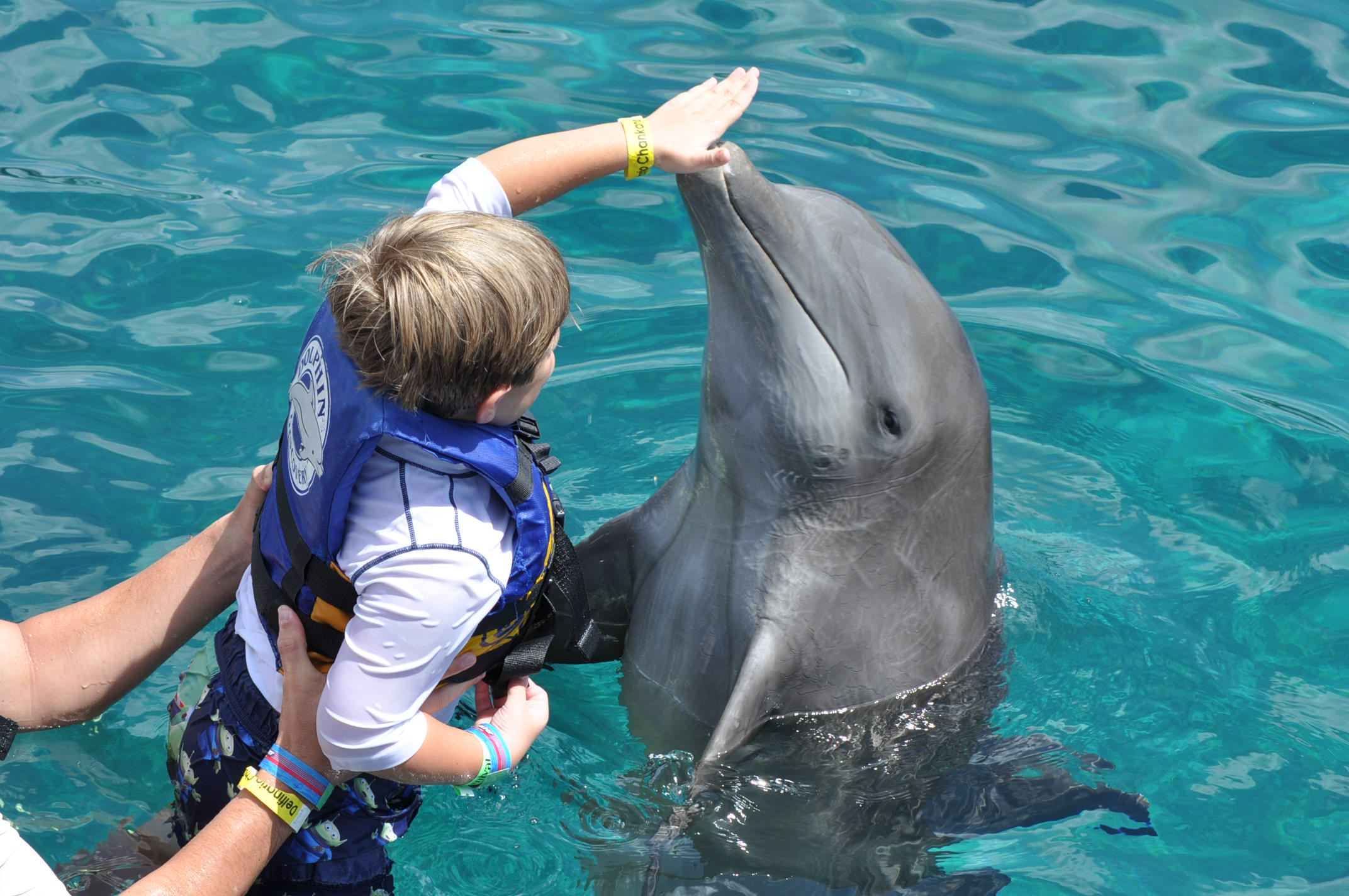
Child "swimming" with dolphin

Swimming with both captive and wild dolphins has become a popular tourist activity around the world. Fascination with dolphins is deep-rooted in many cultures; wild dolphins appear in stories as mythical or god-like creatures with a symbiotic relationship to humans, for example in the legends of pre-historic Africans, ancient Greeks and Romans, and the Maori in New Zealand. Historical accounts of dolphin-human interaction, particularly around cooperative fishing, have been reported in geographically diverse locations for centuries. During the 20th century, there were many cases of solitary wild dolphins who developed friendships with humans and eventually became tourist attractions themselves.

Modern representations of dolphins in the popular media, such as the 1960s television series Flipper; depictions of happy people swimming with dolphins in advertisements for holiday destinations; the belief that dolphins love humans and performing for them; the rise of wildlife-adventure tourism; documentaries about dolphin-assisted therapy and the "healing attributes" of dolphins; and the proliferation of "wildlife selfies" in social media have all contributed to the desirability of the swim-with-dolphins experience.

=== Captive dolphins ===
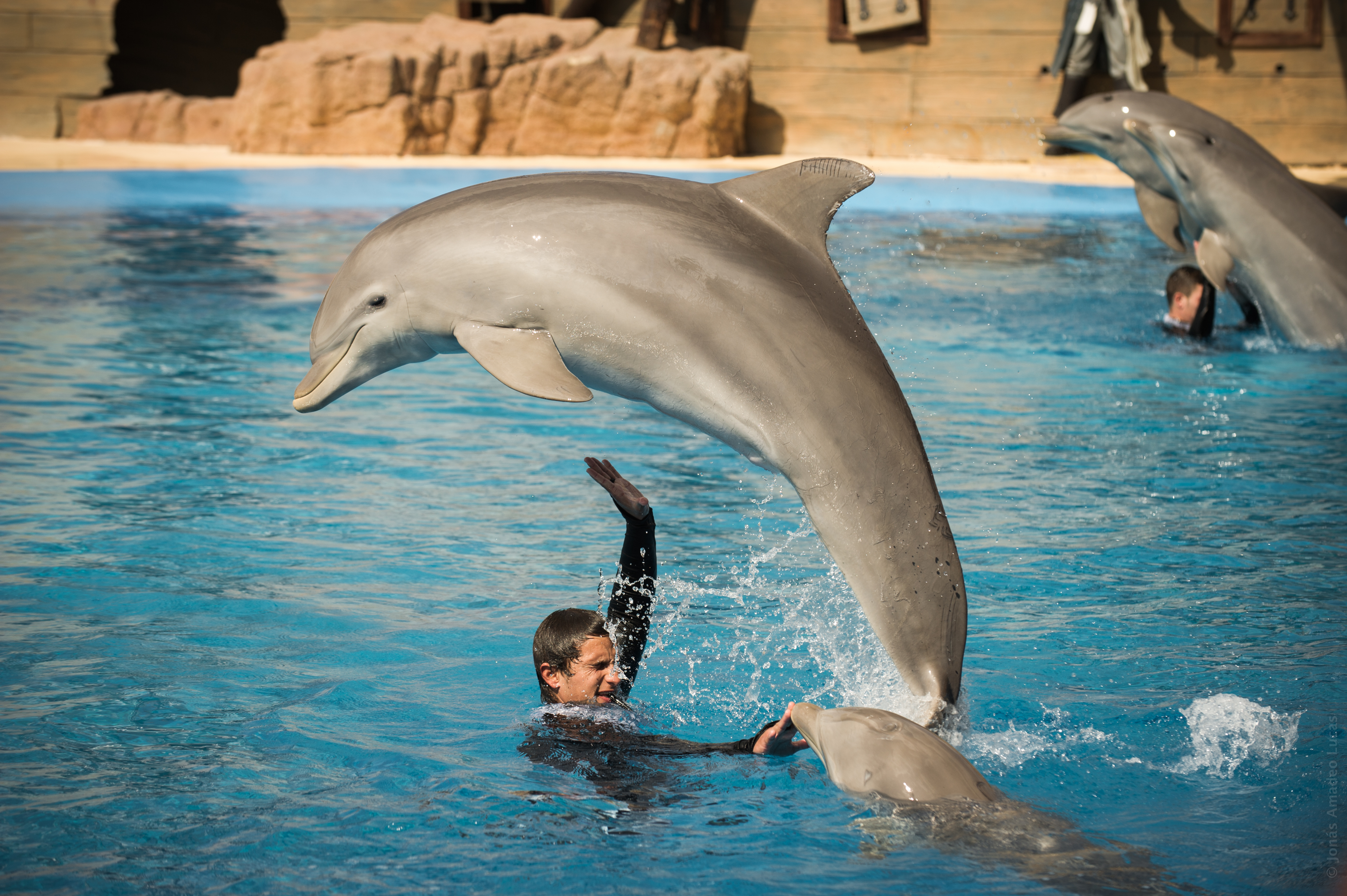
Captive dolphins performing tricks for tourists

Large marine parks in the United States such as Sea World in Florida first started offering a small number of tourists the opportunity to enter their dolphin pools to touch and swim with dolphins in the 20th century. As of 2006, there were approximately 18 facilities for swimming with dolphins in the United States alone.

In a typical tourist encounter with captive dolphins, a small group of up to twelve people are briefed about how to behave; upon entering the water, dolphins swim past them. The tourists are then given an opportunity to touch or stroke the dolphins, which perform tricks in exchange for "rewards" from their trainers. The highlight for most tourists is "the feeling of being dragged along while holding on to the dolphin's fins"; having photos or videos taken during the experience also adds to their enjoyment long afterwards. Tourism industry studies have concluded that while most tourists taking part in swim-with-dolphin activities are impressed with the "grace, size, and power of dolphins", they tend to feed back that the experience is too short and too staged, and come away with concerns over the dolphins' welfare in captivity.

In Hawaii, captive dolphin attractions have become controversial. While resorts such as The Kahala Hotel & Resort and the Hilton Waikoloa Village offer tourists with the opportunity to swim with dolphins, newer establishments such as the Ko Olina Resort have stated that they will not keep captive dolphins. Dolphin Quest, a company which operates "swim-with dolphin" facilities in Hawaii, has argued that income from tourism has helped to fund the scientific study and conservation of marine mammals. Furthermore, they insist that the welfare of dolphins is often better in their care than in the wild, where dolphins are exposed to pollution, disease, injuries from boats, and insufficient food sources.

=== Wild dolphins ===
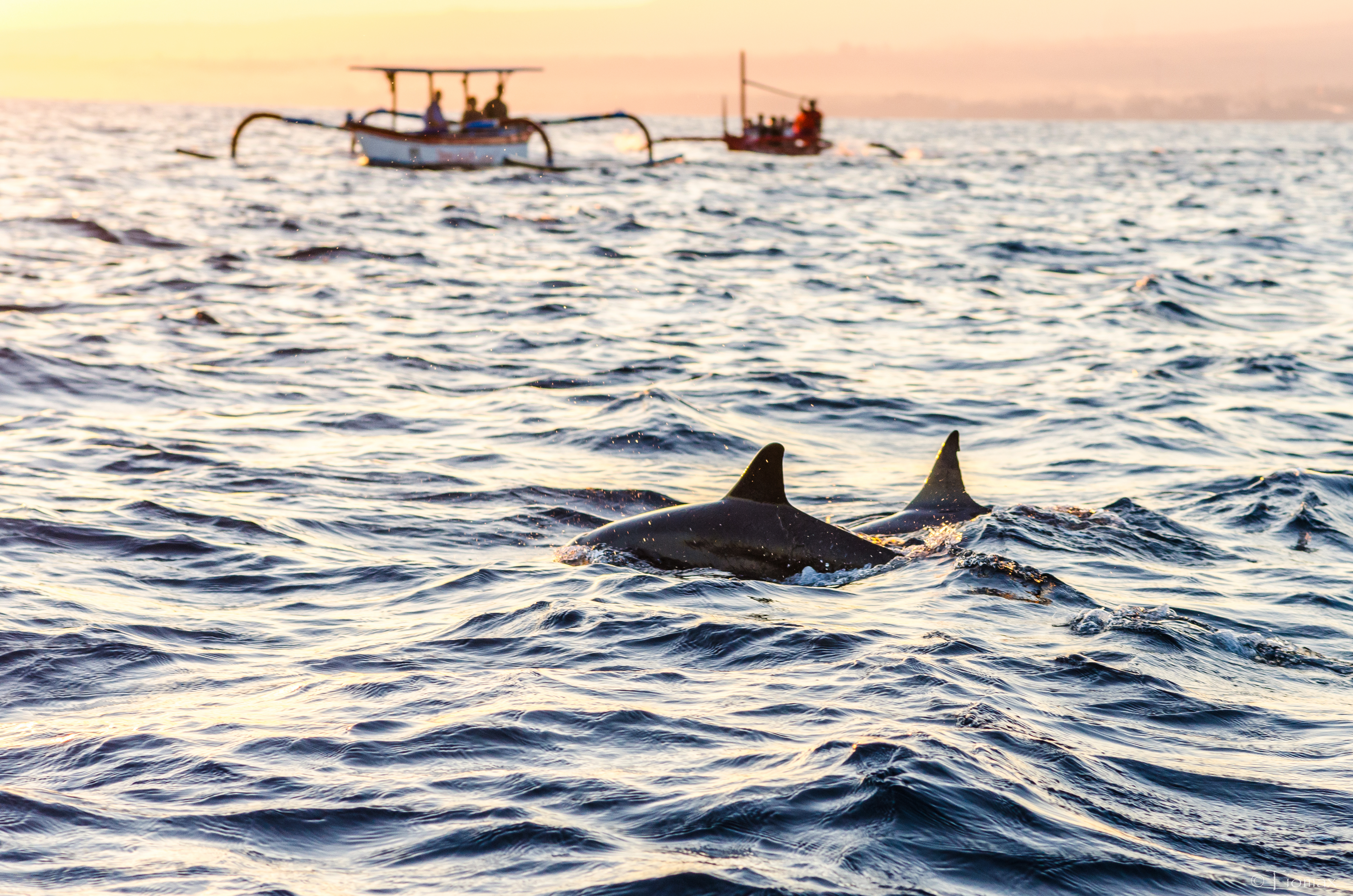
Wild dolphins racing near boats

As of 2006, in the Caribbean, there were more than 30 marine attractions offering tourists and cruise ship passengers the chance to swim with dolphins, with similar tourist activities in European tourist destinations including Spain, the Algarve, and the Canary Islands, and across the Middle East and Asia. In many locations, small- and medium-sized tour operators take tourists by boat to look for dolphin pods and swim with wild dolphins, snorkeling freely, or holding onto ropes.

A study by eco/wildlife tourism researcher Susanna Curtin found that while tourists who swim with wild dolphins consistently feed back that the experience was "disappointingly brief", they tend to express feelings of satisfaction from seeing the dolphins in their "natural setting".

== Impact on dolphins ==
=== Health ===
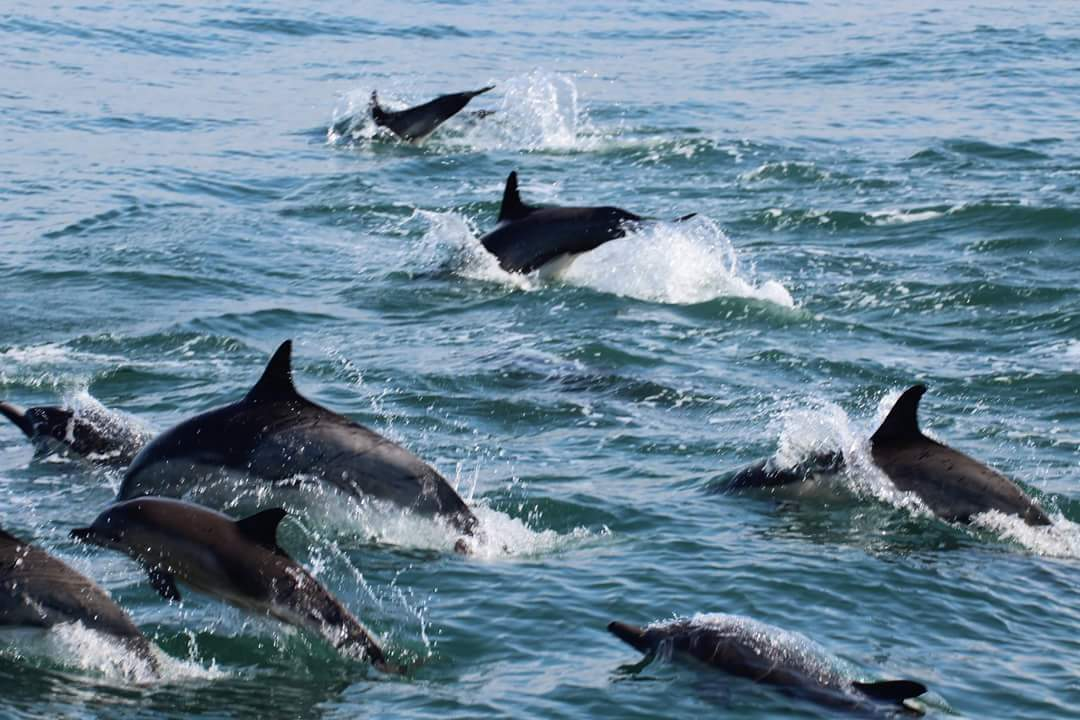
Pod of Pacific white-sided dolphins near Monterey Bay

Swimming with dolphins has resulted in stress, injury, and death for dolphins. Dolphins are often susceptible to similar respiratory ailments as humans, and swimming in confined spaces can add to mental distress and weaken their immune systems. Behavioral and wildlife biologist Toni Frohoff has stated that even if dolphins appear to be enjoying their interaction with humans, they may be "performing" out of fear of isolation and punishment.

=== Population ===
In the Bay of Islands north of Auckland, New Zealand, the population of wild bottlenose dolphins shrank by 90 percent – from approximately 270 to only 30 – during a period of 20 years. According to the Department of Conservation in New Zealand, boat tours offering passengers the chance to swim with dolphin pods had upset their normal resting and feeding behaviour, and led to a 75 percent mortality rate among calves.

== Risks to humans ==
Humans have been injured while swimming with dolphins, which are not domesticated animals. According to National Geographic magazine, "Reports in peer-reviewed papers indicate that dolphins have bitten people, rammed into them, or slapped them with their flukes. Even professional dolphin trainers have been charged, butted, bitten, or held down at the bottom of a tank." Dolphins are able to distinguish between men and women, and can be sexually aggressive towards women.

Although the shape of the dolphins' jaw is interpreted by many humans as "smiling", dolphins in captivity may in fact be suffering from distress. Wild dolphins may become aggressive when they swim close to boats anticipating snacks and don't receive any.

== Legislation ==
In 2005, Costa Rica banned swimming with dolphins or whales, and made it illegal to keep them in captivity.

In 2019, the New Zealand Department of Conservation banned tourists from swimming with bottlenose dolphins in the Bay of Islands region. In 2021, the National Oceanic Atmospheric Association (NOAA) in the United States banned tourists and residents from swimming with wild spinner dolphins in Hawaii.

== See also ==
- Animal-assisted therapy
- List of dolphinariums (aquaria for public display of dolphins)
