= Hurricane Emily (2005) =

Category 5 Atlantic hurricane

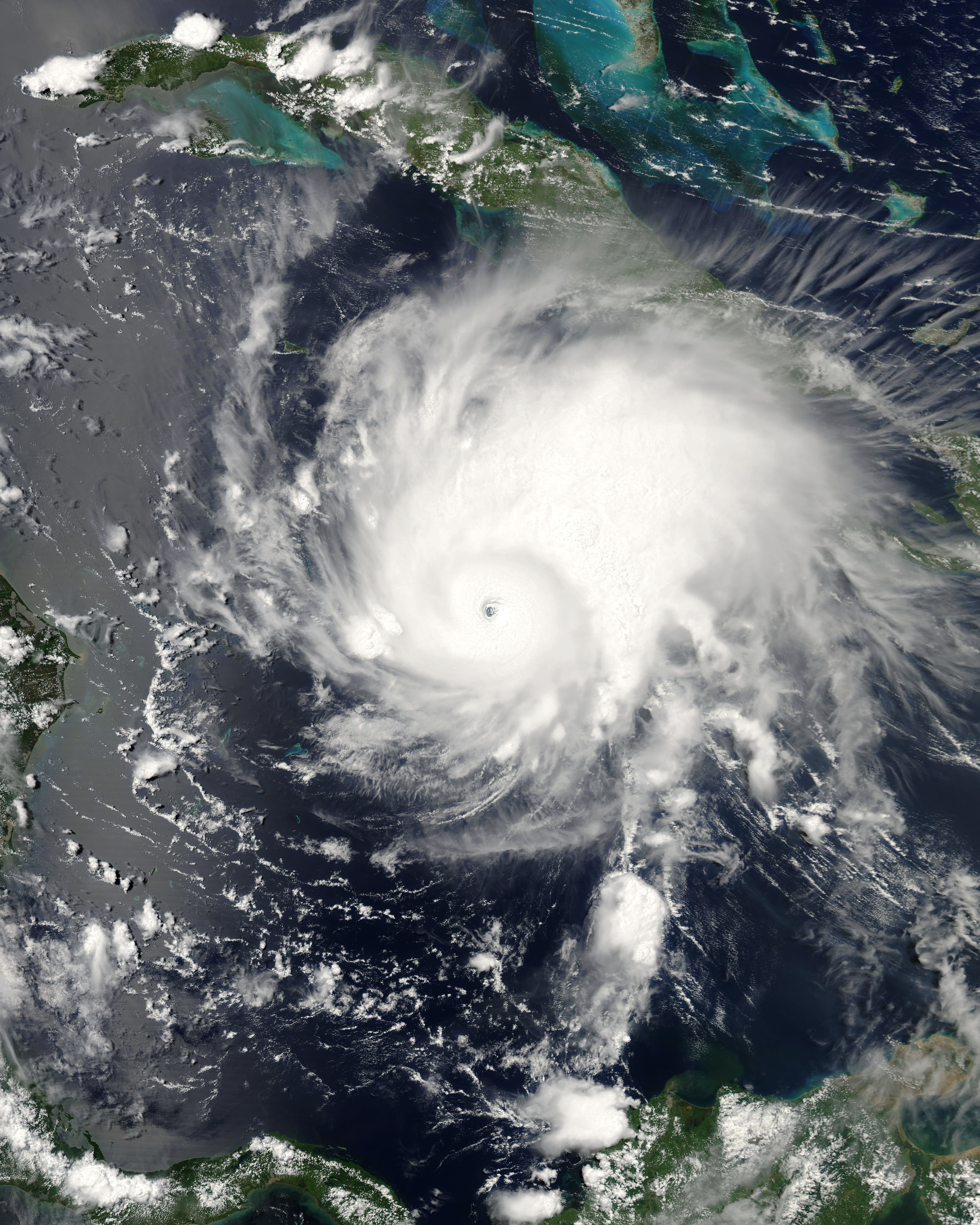
- Emily near peak intensity south of Jamaica on July 16

Meteorological history
- Formed: July 11, 2005
- Dissipated: July 21, 2005

Category 5 major hurricane
- 1-minute sustained (SSHWS/NWS)
- Highest winds: 160 mph (260 km/h)
- Lowest pressure: 929 mbar (hPa); 27.43 inHg

Overall effects
- Fatalities: 22
- Damage: >$436 million (2005 USD)
- Areas affected: Lesser Antilles, Venezuela, Greater Antilles, Honduras, Belize, Mexico, Texas
- IBTrACS
- Part of the 2005 Atlantic hurricane season

Hurricane Emily was an extremely rare and powerful tropical cyclone that became the first July Atlantic hurricane to reach Category 5 status on the Saffir-Simpson scale. It remained the only to have done so until Beryl of 2024. The fifth named storm, third hurricane, second major hurricane, and first Category 5 hurricane of the record-breaking 2005 Atlantic hurricane season, Emily formed on July 11 from a tropical wave east of the Lesser Antilles. Three days later, it made landfall on Grenada as a minimal hurricane, just ten months after Hurricane Ivan devastated the region. Emily attained maximum sustained winds of 260 km/h (160 mph) on July 16 while passing southwest of Jamaica, which at the time made it the strongest Atlantic hurricane before the month of August. Slight weakening occurred before Emily made landfall along Mexico's Yucatán Peninsula on July 18 as a Category 4 hurricane. Quickly crossing the peninsula, Emily emerged over the Gulf of Mexico as a minimal hurricane. It reorganized and reached Category 3 intensity before making its final landfall in the Mexican state of Tamaulipas on July 20. It rapidly weakened and dissipated over land on July 21, although thunderstorms reached as far inland as New Mexico. In 2024, Emily was surpassed by Hurricane Beryl as the strongest Atlantic hurricane before August, as measured by maximum sustained winds.

Emily was a powerful early-season tropical cyclone that caused significant damage across the Lesser Antilles, the Caribbean, and Mexico. While moving through the Lesser Antilles, the hurricane produced strong winds and heavy rainfall that caused flooding and landslides across several islands. In Grenada, a man died when a landslide destroyed his house. The hurricane damaged or destroyed 2,641 homes in the country, leaving 167 families homeless. Emily's damage on Grenada totaled EC$121.14 million (US$44.87 million). (Note: All currency totals are unadjusted for inflation.) Later, the hurricane dropped 392 mm (15.43 in) of rainfall on Jamaica, which added to the destruction caused by Hurricane Dennis a week earlier. Damage from the two hurricanes totaled J$5.98 billion (US$96 million) in Jamaica. Also in the country, five people died related to a vehicle accident and floods. In nearby Haiti, flooding from Emily caused ten fatalities. Emily's impacts occurred as far south as Honduras, where one person drowned due to river flooding from the storm.

Ahead of the hurricane's first landfall in Mexico, officials ordered evacuations for popular tourist areas along the eastern Yucatán Peninsula. About 44,000 people evacuated from Cancún International Airport, while another 60,000 people fled to shelters farther inland. One person died in Playa del Carmen while preparing for the storm. Mexico's oil company Pemex evacuated approximately 15,800 workers from oil platforms. Two workers died in a helicopter crash while evacuating. The hurricane lashed northeastern Mexico with strong winds, high waves, a storm surge, and heavy rainfall. The precipitation reached 409 mm (16.1 in) in Cerralvo, Nuevo Leon, more than half of which occurred within 24 hours. The rains caused flooding and landslides that led to two deaths and isolated more than 100 small towns. Across Mexico, Emily's damage was estimated at Mex$3.427 billion (US$322 million). The destructive effects of the hurricane spread into South Texas, where at least nine tornadoes touched down. Flooding also caused US$4.7 million worth of crop damage.

== Meteorological history ==
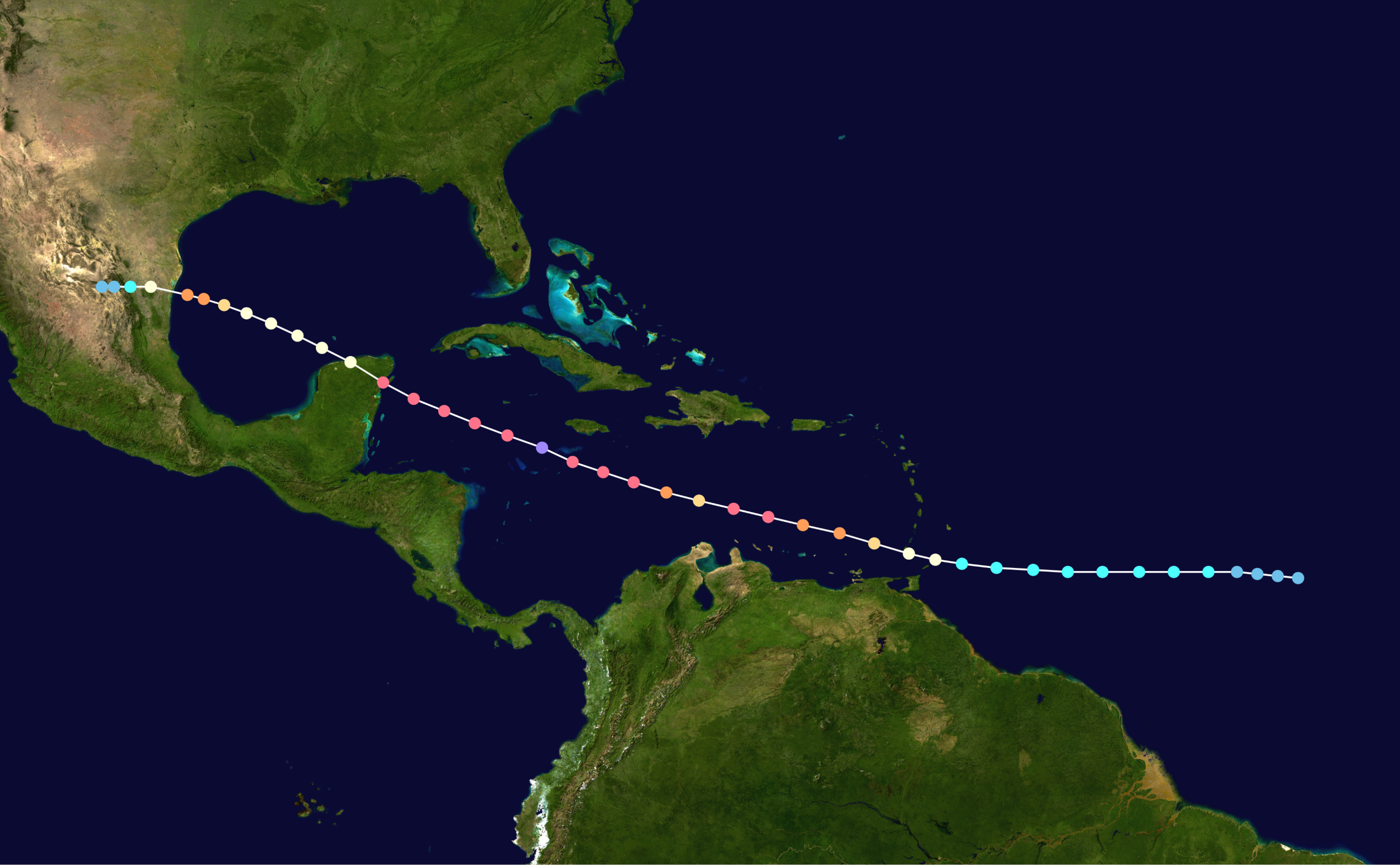
Map plotting the storm's track and intensity, according to the Saffir–Simpson scale Map key Saffir–Simpson scale Tropical depression (≤38 mph, ≤62 km/h) Tropical storm (39–73 mph, 63–118 km/h) Category 1 (74–95 mph, 119–153 km/h) Category 2 (96–110 mph, 154–177 km/h) Category 3 (111–129 mph, 178–208 km/h) Category 4 (130–156 mph, 209–251 km/h) Category 5 (≥157 mph, ≥252 km/h) Unknown Storm type Tropical cyclone Subtropical cyclone Extratropical cyclone, remnant low, tropical disturbance, or monsoon depression

By July 5, 2005, the annual hurricane season was already active, with four named storms. The origins of Hurricane Emily were from a mesoscale convective system that developed over Ethiopia in eastern Africa, which evolved into a tropical wave that moved westward. On July 6, the tropical wave moved off the coast of Africa, associated with a large area of cyclonic turning. The convection, or thunderstorms, became better organized on July 9, prompting the National Hurricane Center (NHC) to include the system as a potential area for tropical cyclone development. Over the next day, the convection became more concentrated as a low-pressure area developed. At 00:00 UTC on July 11, Tropical Depression Five developed in the tropical Atlantic Ocean, about 1,990 km (1,235 mi) east of the southern Lesser Antilles. A ridge to its north steered the nascent depression westward. At first, the depression's development was halted by moderate wind shear and dry air. However, it intensified into Tropical Storm Emily at 00:00 UTC on July 12, 24 hours after its formation.

Initially, the NHC anticipated Emily would move to the west-northwest, potentially affecting the Greater Antilles. Instead, the track remained westerly as Emily continued intensifying. The storm developed outflow and improved rainbands, signs of a maturing tropical cyclone. Sea surface temperatures remained warm along Emily's path, partly due to the spread of warm waters from Hurricane Dennis over the northwestern Caribbean Sea. At first, the storm's structure was asymmetrical, and the center of circulation was occasionally exposed from the thunderstorms. However, thunderstorms fired over the convection, and Emily became a hurricane at 00:00 UTC on July 14. Seven hours later, Hurricane Emily made landfall on northern Grenada with maximum sustained winds of 140 km/h (85 mph). Shortly after striking Grenada, Emily entered the Caribbean Sea as it curved to the west-northwest. At the time, Emily was steered by the ridge to its north building westward. The eye of the hurricane became much more distinct in the center of the convection, and around 18:00 UTC on July 14, Emily strengthened into a major hurricane, the second of the season. Emily's rapid intensification was potentially caused by a plume of air from the Amazon and Orinoco rivers to the south, which then interacted with the warm waters of the Caribbean.

Early on July 15, it reached a preliminary peak intensity as a Category 4 on the Saffir-Simpson scale with sustained winds of 215 km/h (130 mph). The Hurricane Hunters observed two concentric eyewalls, and Emily temporarily weakened, only to re-intensify. On July 16, the eye became embedded within a round central dense overcast as it approached southern Jamaica. The hurricane passed about 165 km (105 mi) south of the island that day. At 00:00 on July 17, Emily attained peak winds of 260 km/h (160 mph), making it a Category 5 on the Saffir-Simpson scale. This was based on observations from the Hurricane Hunters, which observed a minimum pressure of 929 mbar (27.4 inHg). Emily broke the record for the strongest Atlantic hurricane before the month of August, set six days earlier by Hurricane Dennis. Although Hurricane Beryl later broke Emily's record in terms of sustained winds in July 2024, Emily remains the strongest as measured by minimum pressure, as of 2026.

After Emily attained peak intensity, its eye became slightly ragged as the wind speed decreased. The Hurricane Hunters encountered significant turbulence and thunderstorms; however, the strong convection was asymmetric, which led to the slight weakening. On July 18, the eyewall crossed over the island of Cozumel in eastern Mexico. At 06:30 UTC that day, Emily moved over the Yucatán Peninsula mainland at Playa del Carmen, with winds of about 215 km/h (130 mph), still a Category 4. While over land, it weakened significantly, emerging into the Gulf of Mexico as a Category 1 hurricane late on July 18, with its inner core disrupted. With low wind shear and warm waters, Emily restrengthened as the eye redeveloped convection. At 00:00 UTC on July 21, the hurricane attained a secondary peak of 205 km/h (125 mph), making it a Category 3 on the Saffir-Simpson scale. While approaching the coast, Emily had concentric eyewalls, with an inner eye with a diameter of 30 km (18 mi), and an outer eye 93 km (58 mi) in diameter. At 12:00 UTC on July 21, Emily made its final landfall with winds of 205 km/h (125 mph), in the Mexican state of Tamaulipas near San Fernando; the landfall location was about 140 km (85 mi) south of Brownsville, Texas near the Mexico–United States border. The hurricane rapidly weakened over the mountainous terrain of the Sierra Madre Oriental, quickly dropping to tropical storm status and dissipating late on July 21 over northern Mexico.

== Preparations ==
=== Eastern Caribbean and South America ===
After Emily attained tropical storm status on July 12, the various governments of the West Indies began issuing tropical cyclone watches and warnings, including hurricane warnings for Barbados, Grenada, Saint Vincent and the Grenadines, and St. Lucia. A day later, the NHC incorrectly predicted that Emily would move through the islands as a tropical storm. This resulted in the hurricane warnings being downgraded to tropical storm warnings, only to be upgraded back to hurricane warnings on July 14, five hours before Emily's landfall in Grenada. That day, the ABC islands, or Aruba, Bonaire, and Curaçao, also issued a tropical storm warning.

In Grenada, residents were still recovering from Hurricane Ivan ten months prior, which damaged or destroyed approximately 90 percent of housing. The threat from Emily prompted officials to declare a state of emergency. A shortage of construction material had stagnated rebuilding after Ivan. This left fewer buildings as reliable shelters and many homes without roofs by the arrival of Emily. Of the 80 buildings considered for public shelters, 45 were used as such, with 1,650 people seeking refuge in them. Residents rushed to stock up on emergency supplies, emptying grocery stores and resulting in heavy road traffic. The Grenada Red Cross Society affirmed their stockpile of 2,000 jerry cans, 600 blankets, 100 tarps, 50 cots, and 10 generators. They also coordinated evacuations with local transportation services. During the storm's passage, the country's government implemented a nighttime curfew. Telecommunication services Cingular and Digicel suspended service as a precaution.

In the easternmost Caribbean Island of Barbados, the government ordered the closure of businesses while residents stocked up on emergency supplies. Shelters were opened nationwide, and local radio stations broadcast regular warnings to alert the public. The Dominica Red Cross Society confirmed emergency resources were properly stockpiled. Trinidad and Tobago activated its National Emergency Centre and ordered the closure of commerce. Across the country, 544 people sought refuge in shelters. BP evacuated all but 11 essential workers from their 14 oil platforms around the nation. In St. Vincent and the Grenadines, 544 people evacuated to emergency shelters during the storm. Businesses shuttered across St. Vincent as well as St. Lucia. Although airports remained open, British Airways canceled flights to and from Hewanorra International Airport. The St. Lucia Red Cross placed ten response teams on standby, while the Antigua and Barbuda Red Cross had 100 volunteers on standby. The Pan American Disaster Response Unit (PADRU), already preparing its response to Hurricane Dennis, prepared additional supplies for the anticipated effects of Emily.

In Venezuela, a few oil tankers were forced to remain at Puerto la Cruz. Some flights were canceled or delayed as early as July 12, and residents were alerted to the possibility of floods and mudslides. A red alert was issued for Aragua, and 100 personnel were deployed to coastal communities. People living in or visiting the Los Roques Archipelago were advised to remain sheltered in their homes. Alerts were also raised for the nearby islands of Aruba, Bonaire, and Curaçao.

=== Greater Antilles ===
On July 15, the government of Jamaica issued a hurricane warning for the island. After the island's recent impacts from Hurricane Dennis, concerns were raised of further damage in Jamaica, especially with soils already saturated. The Jamaica Red Cross moved supply stockpiles originally intended for Dennis-related relief to southern areas of the island in preparation for Emily. The nation's Office of Disaster Preparedness and Emergency Management provided recommendations to residents, such as advising fishermen to return to port. Prime Minister P. J. Patterson ordered J$100,000 be made available for each of the nation's constituencies. A further J$250,000–300,000 would be allocated for the activation of public shelters. Thousands of residents evacuated from coastal communities or flood-prone areas, including Port Royal and Portmore. Government offices were closed beginning on July 15, and local businesses were advised to do the same. A total of 3,269 Jamaicans utilized the 79 public shelters across the island.

On July 14, residents of the Cayman Islands were alerted to the potential effects of Emily. The following day, the territory issued a hurricane warning. On July 15, shelters were opened across the territory, including two on Cayman Brac, one on Little Cayman, and across Grand Cayman. About 700 people stayed in shelters during the storm. Owen Roberts International Airport shut down for the duration of the hurricane. The Cayman Water Authority shut down services during the storm. The territory's government enacted a curfew and warned all residents that emergency services would not be responding to calls during the storm.

As early as July 14, Haiti began issuing tropical storm warnings. Already severely impacted by Hurricane Dennis, alerts were raised for four departments in Haiti on July 15: Grand'Anse, Ouest, Sud, and Sud-Est. In neighboring Dominican Republic, storm alerts were issued for the towns of Baní and Pedernales.

=== Mexico ===
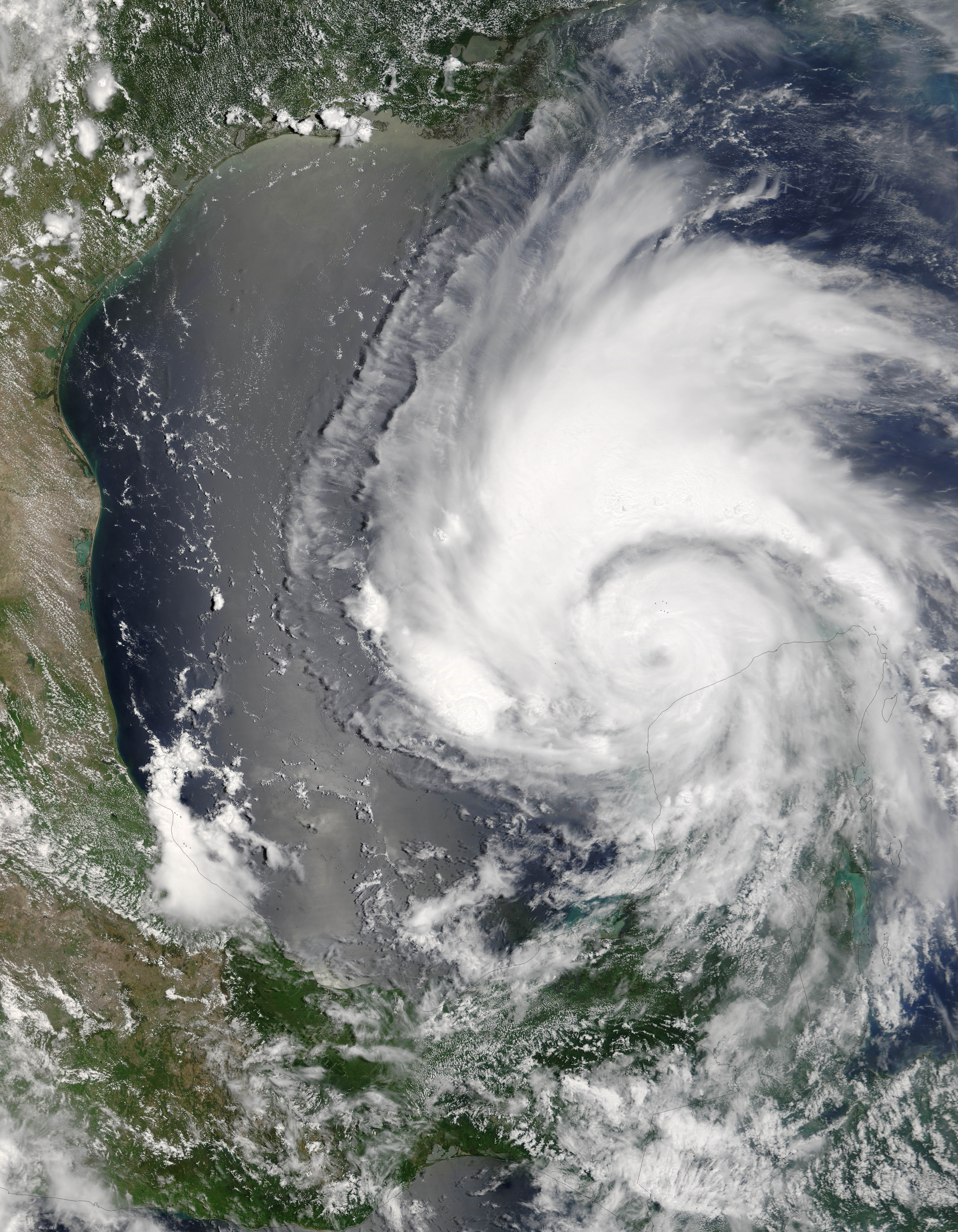
Hurricane Emily on July 18 after emerging from the Yucatán Peninsula

On July 15, the Mexican Red Cross began preparations for potential impact from Emily along the Yucatán Peninsula. The agency transported 30,000 kg (66,000 lb) of supplies to the Yucatán Peninsula. Preparations for evacuating people in coastal areas began on July 16, including the islands of Cozumel, Holbox, and Mujeres. On July 17, the government of Mexico issued hurricane warnings from Chetumal to Campeche. Both Quintana Roo and Yucatán declared a state of emergency ahead of the storm, which opened up federal resources for preparations. A German resident was electrocuted on his roof in Playa del Carmen while preparing for the storm. The Mexican military mobilized in preparation for rescue operations.

The states of Yucatán and Quintana Roo issued the highest level of alert on July 17, likening Emily's trajectory to Hurricane Gilbert in 1988. An estimated 130,000 tourists were visiting the region at the time of Emily's approach. Officials ordered visitors in beach hotels in Cancún to evacuate. About 44,000 people, mainly tourists, evacuated from Cancún International Airport, before the airport closed during the storm's passage. An estimated 60,000 people were relocated to gymnasiums, hotels, and schools farther inland. Some hotels packed 15 people into a single room. Approximately 2,000 tourists from three hotels were locked inside a gymnasium without air conditioning or fans by soldiers. Residents in these areas were advised to stockpile supplies, board up their homes, and shelter in sturdy structures; travel during the storm was advised against. Workers in Cancún removed billboards and traffic lights ahead of the storm to prevent damage. Officials banned the sale of alcohol in Cancún before Emily's landfall. Officials in the state of Yucatán opened 1,108 shelters, and 7,225 people evacuated from coastal areas. Supermarkets in Mérida were packed with residents stocking up on supplies. Emergency services prepped response units for medical needs. During the storm's passage, most businesses were closed. State authorities in Campeche prepared 624 shelters with a collective capacity of 85,000 persons. A state of alert was raised for Veracruz, prompting the readying of shelters.

Emily's threat prompted Mexico's national oil industry, Pemex, to evacuate approximately 15,000 workers from oil platforms in the Bay of Campeche. Two pilots died during the evacuation process when their helicopter crashed amid high winds. The evacuations halted work along 23 oil wells for two days. The hurricane also caused two ports that export crude oil to close. The loss of production was estimated at Mex$4.484 billion (US$421 million), which included the suspension of 2.95 million barrels of oil, as well as 1,600,000,000 ft^{3} (45,000,000 m^{3}) of natural gas. On July 18, the government of Mexico issued hurricane warnings for Tamaulipas from La Cruz northward to the United States border. About 17,000 people evacuated in Tamaulipas, most of whom utilized the 155 shelters opened in the state. Newspapers published the locations of the shelters, while other media, such as radio, television, and texting, were used to spread awareness of the storm.

=== Elsewhere ===
On July 15, Belize's National Emergency Management Organization (NEMO) initiated its preliminary phase of preparedness. Two days later, the country's government issued a tropical storm warning from Belize City northward to its border with Mexico. An all-clear was issued for the nation as Emily traversed the Yucatán Peninsula on July 18. The Costa Rican National Meteorological Institute advised residents in high-risk areas to be alert and to avoid venturing outside in the event of rainfall. Similarly, Defensa Civil de Cuba reminded people to remain vigilant.

Early fears of Emily's potential disruption to oil production in the Gulf of Mexico contributed to a one-dollar rise in prices by July 13, bringing the cost of a barrel to over US$60. Emergency management officials in Escambia County, Florida, became wary of Emily's formation on the heels of Hurricane Dennis. Although the storm was expected to remain in the Caribbean, county officials identified supplies used for Dennis-related relief; an influx of fuel was expected to normalize reserves before any potential impact. On July 17, the American Red Cross began preparations to open shelters and had emergency supplies deployed for rapid distribution in South Texas. Ultimately, 14 shelters were opened across the region, which housed about 4,000 people during the height of the storm. Ahead of Emily's landfall, the NHC issued a tropical storm warning as far north as Baffin Bay, and issued a hurricane warning for extreme southern Texas from Port Mansfield south to the Mexican border. The National Park Service closed Padre Island National Seashore for several days, forcing the evacuation of about 600 motor homes. The Texas Army National Guard mobilized 225 soldiers to assist in preparations. Hundreds of boats returned to port in South Padre Island to ride out the storm.

== Impact ==
Impact by country
Country	Fatalities	Damage (USD)
Grenada	1	$44.87 million
Jamaica	5	<$64.3 million
Haiti	10	N/A
Honduras	1	N/A
Mexico	5	$322 million
United States	0	$4.8 million
Total	22	>$435.97 million

Along its path through the Atlantic, Caribbean, and the Gulf of Mexico, Hurricane Emily contributed to 22 fatalities, including ten in Haiti, five in Jamaica, five in Mexico, one in Grenada, and one in Honduras.

=== Lesser Antilles ===
While passing south of the island, Emily produced wind gusts of 68 km/h (43 mph) on Barbados. Damaging winds downed trees and tore the roof off two homes.

Hurricane Emily produced flooding and landslides across both Trinidad and Tobago, the island country south of Grenada. On Tobago, the hurricane destroyed two houses, and another 30 homes lost their roofs. On neighboring Trinidad, floodwaters reached 0.91 m (3 ft), inundating at least 200 houses, while strong winds destroyed eight roofs. Rivers in the country's capital, Port of Spain, and across central Tobago topped their banks; many roads were inundated. Thirty people required evacuation in Chaguanas. Flooding in Couva left Caparo Village temporarily isolated. At least 16 homes lost their roofs and 2 collapsed amid gusty winds. Approximately 40 percent of residences—15,630 Trinidad and Tobago Electricity Commission customers: 11,000 in Trinidad and 4,330 in Tobago—lost power, and communications were temporarily lost with a town in the northern part of the country. In San Juan–Laventille, the Aranguez Bridge was rendered impassable after its supporting gabions were washed away. Landslides occurred along multiple sections of the Blanchisseuse Road between Matelot and Toco. Strong winds downed power lines on the island, one of which sparked a fire. Two homes were destroyed and thirty others were damaged across Trinidad while extensive flooding was reported island-wide.

In St. Vincent and the Grenadines, one child was injured during the storm. On the island of St. Vincent, flooding and landslides closed roads, damaging two houses. The most extensive impacts occurred on Union Island, where 21 homes were damaged, including four that lost their roofs. The hurricane also disrupted the island's water service after overturning a water tank. On the nearby island of Canouan, four homes had their roofs torn off and three others had major damage. The roof of Canouan Airport was also damaged, although that did not affect the airport's operations. Losses to the banana crop were minimal.

Elsewhere, debris washed ashore in St. Lucia due to the hurricane.

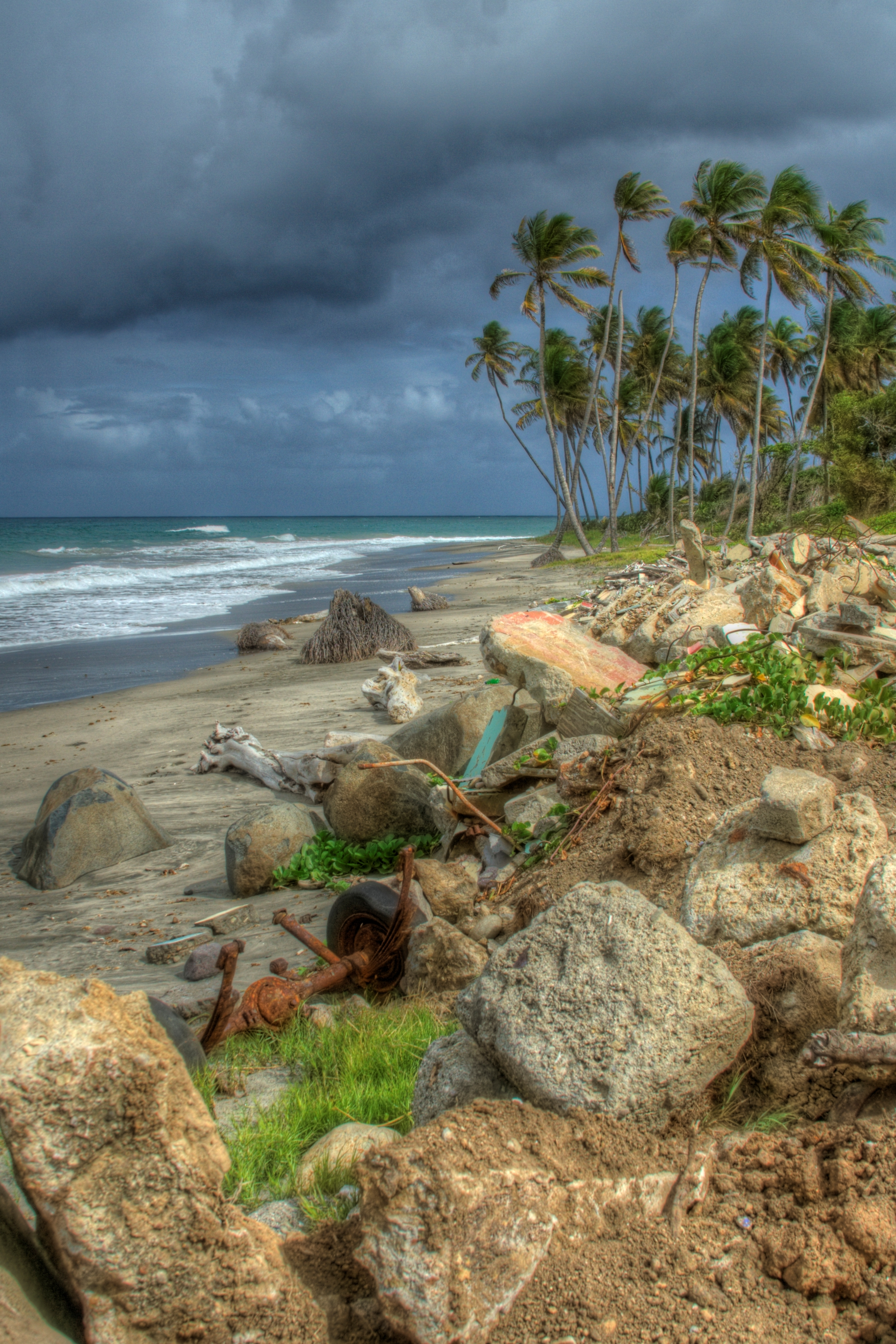
Debris from Hurricanes Ivan and Emily littered the shores of Grenada even into August 2007

==== Grenada ====
Striking Grenada as a hurricane, Emily's strongest winds affected the northeastern portion of the island, as well as the smaller islands of Carriacou and Petite Martinique. However, there were no wind observations from those areas, and the highest reported wind gust in the country was 107 km/h (67 mph), recorded at Point Salines International Airport. While crossing the island, Emily dropped 73.1 mm (2.88 in) of rainfall at the airport. The rains caused widespread landslides, particularly in mountainous areas of northern Grenada as well as vegetation damaged by Hurricane Ivan ten months prior. The landslides damaged 89 km (55 mi) worth of farming access roads, and damaged one bridge so much that it was rebuilt. In St. Cloud in Saint Andrew Parish, a landslide destroyed a house, killing a man. Emily's floods swept up leftover debris from Ivan, damaging some roads and bridges. Much of the nation lost its water supply, though restoration of power quickly remedied this.

Emily inflicted extensive damage on the already storm-battered nation. Still recovering from Hurricane Ivan, Grenada received about EC$121.14 million worth of damage (US$44.87 million) from Emily, equivalent to 11.2% of its yearly gross domestic product (GDP). Hurricane-force winds tore roofs from homes, devastated agriculture, and worsened the nation's struggling economy. More than half of the damage cost was related to housing, after the hurricane damaged 2,641 homes; this included 174 that were destroyed and 896 that lost their roofs, leaving 167 families homeless. The hardest-hit areas were Saint Andrew and Saint Patrick parishes. Most of the damaged houses had been recently repaired after Hurricane Ivan. Two storm shelters lost their roofs.

The hurricane also wrecked health facilities and damaged 21 schools nationwide, including five that were completely demolished. Two of the main hospitals were flooded, including the one just rebuilt with assistance from Cuba after Ivan. In the general hospital in Grenada's capital, St. George's, the hurricane damaged windows and caused flooding that forced the evacuation of the female medical ward. Also in St. George's, Emily severely damaged one-third of the roof of an assisted living facility. Flooding affected communities in Saint George's, notably in Grenville. Most water systems across the country had excess silt, while several water transmission lines were damaged. In Saint Mark, a longline fishing commercial fishing boat was lost after it broke from its anchor. At Mount Rich in St. Patrick Parish, the hurricane destroyed the roof of a medical station, while another medical station was damaged in Saint Andrew Parish. Mount Rich saw the destruction of half its homes. A police station in Sauteurs, in St. Patrick Parish, lost its roof. The combination of strong winds and flooding rains disrupted the agriculture industry's recovery after Ivan, after Emily knocked down trees and eroded away soil. About 80% of the banana plants were lost. Cash crops, including corn and pigeon peas, were largely lost, while breadfruit, nutmeg, and cocoa trees were negatively impacted. The hurricane also killed 144 livestock.

In the small island of Carriacou, north of Grenada, the hurricane severely damaged the roof of Princes Royal Hospital, forcing patients to evacuate. At Top Hill, also on the island, the hurricane heavily damaged an assisted living facility. The storm's winds knocked down about 3 acres (1.2 hectares) of the island's forests. Flooding inundated Carriacou's landfill and damaged the roads leading to it; the conditions led to an outbreak of mosquitos. Near Lauriston Airport, the storm's waves damaged 25% of the mangrove forest. The hurricane unearthed a skeleton, as well as pottery fragments, which were discovered by an archeological team on Carriacou. On Petite Martinique, the hurricane damaged many homes. Fishing boats sustained damage on both Carriacou and Petite Martinique.

=== Western Caribbean ===
While passing south of Jamaica, Emily dropped heavy rainfall, reaching 392 mm (15.43 in) at Potsdam in Saint Elizabeth Parish. In the same parish, a car with a family of three became trapped in floodwaters, while two nearby residents attempted to assist; all five people died in the incident. The close succession of hurricanes Dennis and Emily left J$5.98 billion (US$96 million) worth of damage to Jamaica; the Meteorological Service of Jamaica attributed at least J$1.9 billion (US$31.7 million) to Dennis. Heavy rainfall from Emily led to landslides across eastern Jamaica. Extensive flooding occurred in Saint Elizabeth Parish, with many roads rendered impassable or washed away altogether. Destruction of a coastal road rendered Treasure Beach inaccessible. In Manchester Parish, at least 20 homes were inundated by floodwaters. In Black River, lightning struck and hospitalized a child. The storm left nearly 80,000 people without power, including some people who were still waiting for power restoration after Dennis. Despite the hurricane's intensity, only one location in Jamaica, Montego Bay, recorded gale-force winds. Offshore Discovery Bay, the hurricane displaced sediment onto coral reefs and into shipping channels.

Hurricane Emily dropped heavy rainfall across Haiti, causing floods that caused ten fatalities after people were swept away from vehicles and homes. The hurricane destroyed at least 37 houses, while another 113 homes were damaged.

The hurricane produced gale-force winds in the Cayman Islands, not strong enough to cause any damage.

While passing south of Cuba, the outer rainbands of Emily produced heavy rainfall and coastal flooding on Isla de la Juventud.

In Honduras, rainfall from Emily caused river flooding, which killed a man in the country's capital Tegucigalpa. Flooding and landslides forced dozens of people in the city to evacuate.

=== Mexico ===
Throughout Mexico, Emily directly caused Mex$3.427 billion (US$322 million) worth of damage, not including the Mex$4.484 billion (US$421 million) in lost oil production.

==== Yucatán Peninsula ====
Moving ashore Quintana Roo in the eastern Yucatán Peninsula, Emily produced winds of 215 km/h (134 mph) in Puerto Aventuras. The anemometer in Cancún failed after recording winds of 55 km/h (34 mph). The strongest winds were confined to a small area around Emily's center. Farther inland, winds reached 90 km/h (56 mph) in Yucatán state near the Río Lagartos. The hurricane produced high tides and waves along eastern Quintana Roo. An amateur radio from Cozumel estimated a storm surge of 4.6 m (15 ft) in San Miguel. The high waves damaged 15 km (9.3 mi) of dunes and reefs in Cozumel. The waves also wrecked 1,510 turtle nests, with the loss of 181,200 eggs. On the offshore Isla Mujeres, the waves damaged 1,100 m (3,600 ft) of retaining walls to protect areas from flooding. Due to the relatively fast movement of Emily, rainfall was fairly light, peaking at 120 mm (4.9 in) in Cozumel. Rainfall reached 53 mm (2.1 in) in Mérida, Yucatán. Along the mainland, surge heights were generally less than 1 m (4 ft). Additionally, waves reached 4 m (13 ft), resulting in some beach erosion and damage to dunes and coral reefs. Offshore Cozumel, the hurricane decreased the coral reef coverage by 27%. Additionally, 1.1 km (0.7 mi) of retaining walls sustained damage, leaving areas vulnerable to flooding from future storms.

Across the Yucatán Peninsula, Emily's damage was estimated at Mex$1.323 billion (US$124 million), of which two-thirds was in the state of Yucatán. Emily also caused about Mex$807 million (US$75.9 million) in indirect damages, such as loss of tourism revenue. Areas in Playa del Carmen, Tulum and Cozumel sustained the most severe impact. In Quintana Roo, hotels sustained about 86% of the state's damage and losses, incurring Mex$307 million (US$29 million) in damage. The hurricane damaged 12,500 hotel rooms, representing 20% of the rooms in the entire state. More than 3,000 rooms were closed for three months. The storm damage dropped the hotel occupancy from 88.8% to 71.7%. Emily's strong winds also knocked down trees and thousands of power poles, some of which fell onto houses. Power outages lasted five days, affecting 197,018 people. A total of 851 homes sustained damage due to Emily, of which 57 were destroyed. The hurricane damaged 76 school facilities, most of them in Cozumel or Solidaridad; due to the time of year, the damage did not affect the school year. Emily's passage also damaged 5,400 ha (13,000 acres) of forests or agricultural areas, with some trees stripped of their leaves and branches. The storm damage also damaged about 11,000 beehives. The state's fishing industry sustained minor damage to lobster traps.

In Yucatán state, Emily caused Mex$892.7 million (US$83.7 million) worth of damage. The hurricane damaged about 17,000 houses to some degree, including 10,949 that were significantly damaged. The hurricane's winds knocked down 1,780 power poles and 20 transmission towers. Across Yucatán, Emily damaged 209 schools, mostly to walls and roofs. The winds also damaged 34,956 hectares (86,380 acres) worth of crops in the state, mostly affecting corn producers, while also killing 3,000 livestock. The hurricane also damaged 41,484 beehives, disrupting the state's honey industry for nearly 2,500 producers. Along the northern coast, waves and a 0.5 m (1.6 ft) storm surge caused minor flooding, while also damaging 24 fishing boats. The rains generated puddles but no floods in the state. The storm damaged 16 water irrigation units across five municipalities.

==== Northeastern Mexico ====
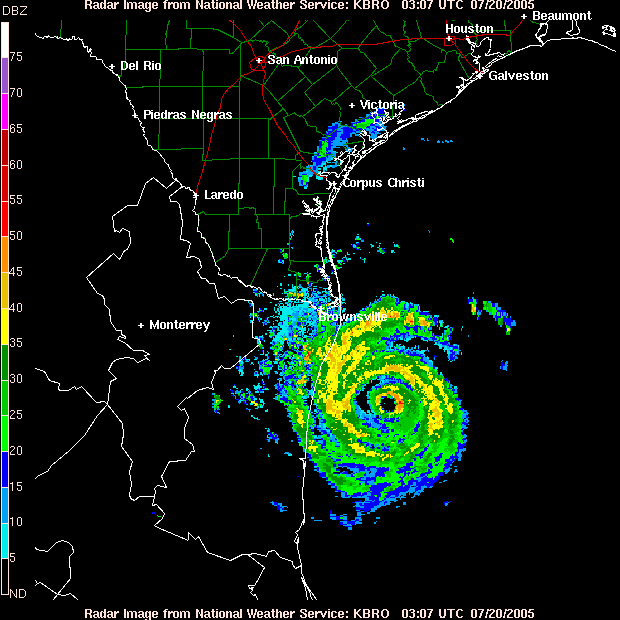
Radar imagery depicting Emily near its final landfall

During its final landfall in northeastern Mexico, a weather station in San Fernando, Tamaulipas, 55 km (30 mi) inland, recorded wind gusts of 166 km/h (97 mph). Wind gusts in the landfall region were estimated as high as 230 km/h (145 mph). Along the coast, the storm surge, in conjunction with waves, produced flooding in low-lying areas that reached about 4 m (13 ft) deep. The hurricane produced heavy rainfall during its passage. A station in El Mante Municipality, Tamaulipas, recorded 353 mm (13.9 in) over three days. The heavy rains extended inland, peaking at 409 mm (16.1 in) in Cerralvo, Nuevo Leon, of which 350 mm (14 in) fell over 24 hours. This was greater than three times the average July rainfall of 75 mm (3.0 in). The rains caused mudslides and river flooding in both Tamaulipas and Nuevo Leon, leaving more than 100 small towns isolated. The rains also raised the water levels of dams and aquifers. Floodwaters killed women in separate incidents in San Carlos in Tamaulipas, as well as San Pedro Garza Garcia in Nuevo Leon.

Damage was heaviest in the state of Tamaulipas, just south of the U.S.-Mexican border, with the total estimated at Mex$1.491 billion (US$140 million). The strong winds knocked down trees or lifted trees, power poles, signs, and roofs. Throughout the state, Emily left more than 115,000 people without power. Across the state, Emily damaged 10,103 houses to some degree, including 2,461 that were destroyed. The most significant damage occurred in San Fernando, where 45.9% of houses were affected by the storm. Across the state, the hurricane also damaged 34 health facilities, as well as 145 schools. The hurricane also caused significant agricultural damage, including to warehouses and silos, with 141 wineries reporting damage. Throughout the state, the hurricane wrecked 8,229 metric tons (18,142,000 pounds) worth of crops, mostly cotton, while also killing 18,730 heads of livestock. Along the coast, the hurricane also damaged five piers and 367 boats. In fishing communities along Laguna Madre, over 80% of the buildings were destroyed as a result of the storm surge. Across 11 municipalities, the hurricane damaged water systems, affecting 226,000 people. The damage included pipes, wells, pumping equipment, and irrigation channels. A total of 1,368 km (850 mi) worth of roads, mostly rural, were damaged, which represented 17.7% of the roads in Tamaulipas.

Damage in Nuevo Leon reached Mex$612.4 million (US$57.5 million). Throughout the state, Hurricane Emily damaged 8,077 houses to some degree, including 132 that were destroyed, and another 359 that were required to be moved before rehabilitation. The hurricane also damaged 89 health facilities, including three hospitals, as well as 64 schools. The heavy rains filled aqueducts and dams in the state. The rains eroded part of the San Pedro aqueduct and caused a partial collapse. The floods left the municipalities of Santa Catarina and García without power for several days. Floods also washed out a bridge in Guadalupe along the Río Santa Catarina, causing a natural gas leak that was contained a few hours later. The floods also damaged three other bridges in the state. A total of 1,780 km (1,110 mi) worth of roads were damaged, mostly related to erosion or landslides. This included a closure of the Linares-San Roberto federal highway for two days. Floods and strong winds also damaged irrigation canals in mountainous areas of Nuevo Leon. Throughout the state, the hurricane left 262,687 people without power, which was restored within three days. Unlike in other states, the rains were beneficial due to their timing during harvest season.

=== United States ===
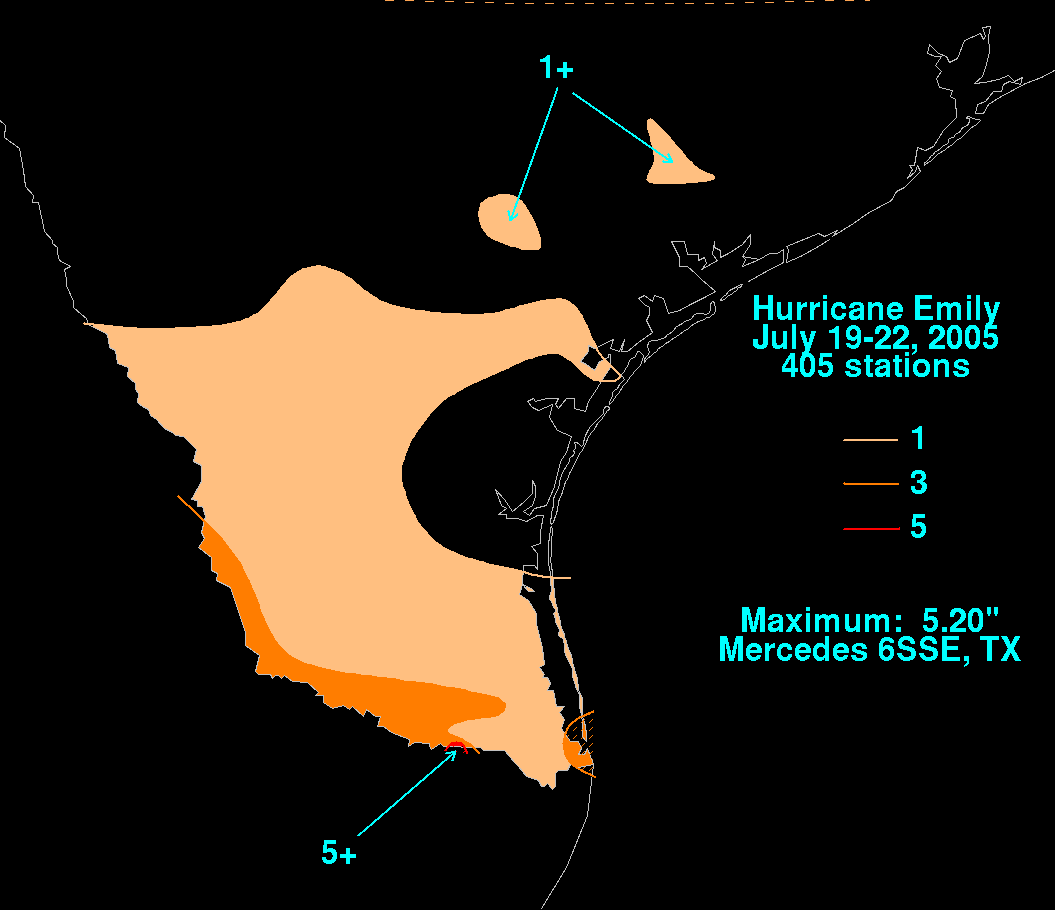
Total rainfall from Emily in Texas

While making its final landfall in northeastern Mexico, Emily's outer rainbands spread into South Texas, with peak wind gusts of 102 km/h (63 mph) recorded in Brownsville. The hurricane produced 1.2 to 1.5 m (4 to 5 ft) tides, causing flooding and beach erosion. Rainfall in the state reached 130 mm (5.2 in) in Mercedes, located near the United States border. Emily's rainbands spawned at least nine tornadoes across southern Texas. A tornado touched down north of Alice and was rated an F1 on the Fujita scale. The tornado destroyed a mobile home, damaged nearby houses, and uprooted several trees along its 19 km (12 mi) path. Damage was estimated at US$100,000. The rest of the tornadoes were rated F0. A short-lived tornado in Cameron County destroyed a mobile home. An F0 tornado touched down for about 1.6 km (1 mi) near Bruni. The tornado flung a truck camper shell about 150 m (500 ft), while also damaging fences and trees. A tornado touched down in open fields of Jim Wells County, which crossed into Duval County, remaining on the ground for about 11 km (7 mi). The tornado damaged a few houses. Another tornado touched down in rural parts of Jim Wells County, which crossed into Live Oak County. There were also short-lived tornadoes in open fields in Hidalgo, Jim Hogg, San Patricio, and Zapata counties.

In southern Texas, damage was generally minor. There was scattered roof damage on South Padre Island. Along the coast, high tides eroded dunes and beaches, while also flooding cars as well as portions of State Route 100. Heavy rains caused flash flooding, closing a portion of State Route 4, and shutting down several businesses in McAllen. The gale-force winds also knocked down trees. The storm left about 27,500 people without power, but most service was quickly restored. The hurricane's rains were generally beneficial to farmers, due to drought conditions across the region. However, the storm's rains damaged 30% of the cotton crop in Willacy and Cameron counties, with damage estimated at US$4.7 million.

Farther inland, the remnants of Emily produced scattered thunderstorms across southeastern New Mexico.

== Aftermath ==
=== Grenada ===
On the day of Emily's passage, the Government of Grenada began relief supply distribution and conducted aerial damage assessments. The Ministry of Works coordinated the deployment of worker crews. Grenada informed the United Nations that they could largely handle the disaster on their own, though some international assistance would be needed. Following further assessments, the nation formally appealed for international aid on July 18. As the country was already experiencing a construction boom following Hurricane Ivan, the government projected the GDP to grow by 11.91% during the year 2005. After Hurricane Emily, the government revised the projections to a growth of 11.8%. Despite the damage to housing and agriculture, the hurricane did not significantly affect the construction or other industries.

The Grenada Coast Guard assisted with the distribution of emergency supplies to Carriacou on July 15. Power was restored to much of the nation within a day of the hurricane, though some residences would remain disconnected for several days. Businesses resumed normal operations on July 16.

On July 15, the IFRC launched a joint-disaster appeal of 750,000 Swiss francs (US$590,000) for relief efforts related to Hurricanes Dennis and Emily. The target goal was 35,000 people throughout Grenada, Jamaica, and Haiti. Initial relief in Grenada would be carried out by the Grenada Red Cross, with focus placed on providing shelter and psychological support. The Government of Grenada made a request for 10,000–15,000 tarpaulins, hygiene kits, jerry cans, and first aid kits to the IFRC. The Oxford Committee for Famine Relief (OXFAM) deployed to Carriacou to build pit latrines. Food for the Poor "rushed" to assist Grenadians. India provided galvanized roofing material with expected delivery in August. UNICEF provided 10,000 oral rehydration salts, 5,000 water purification tablets, 500 water containers (with a collective capacity of 5,000 L (1,300 US gal)), and several trauma kits.

=== Elsewhere ===
The Pan American Disaster Response Unit (PADRU) sent an airplane to the Haitian Red Cross on July 17 with blankets and cleaning supplies. The Haitian government coordinated with the IFRC to assist victims in Saint-Marc.

Jamaica's Rapid Damage Assessment Team conducted aerial assessments on July 17 to determine the extent of flooding. The Jamaican Red Cross distributed food, mattresses, and utensils. By early August, every storm shelter but one had closed, the exception being a displaced family whose house was destroyed. By April 2006, Jamaica's banana industry had recovered, following the back-to-back strikes of hurricanes Dennis and Emily.

Mexico's Secretariat of the Interior declared a state of emergency across four states, including the entirety of Quintana Roo and Yucatán, 21 municipalities in Tamaulipas, and another 31 municipalities in Nuevo Leon. The government set up temporary employment programs across the four states toward repairing houses and clearing roads. The country's Secretaría de Desarrollo Social (SEDESOL) provided financial assistance toward rebuilding residents' damaged homes. In Quintana Roo, the country's Fondo de Desastres Naturales (Natural Disaster Fund) helped finance the construction of 167 homes away from high-risk areas. Also in the state, the Comisión Nacional del Agua (CONAGUA) set up two water purifying stations in Quintana Roo. The agency had a crew of 54 people to disinfect and sanitize water systems for 6,201 people. In Yucatán state, the federal government provided financial assistance to 500 families toward building new homes. Due to power outages, CONAGUA opened temporary water treatment plants across nine municipalities. Mexico's Comisión Federal de Electricidad, or Federal Electricity Commission, announced that all new power installations in the state of Yucatán would be underground, after the electrical damage caused by Emily and previously Hurricane Isidore in 2002. Three months after Hurricane Emily, Hurricane Wilma struck the eastern Yucatán peninsula, causing further damage to the region.

After the hurricane's final landfall in the state of Tamaulipas, a dengue fever developed and affected 1,032 people. More than 1,700 health workers visited shelters and homes to prevent the further spread of disease, with the primary illness being acute respiratory infections. In Nuevo León, workers used heavy machinery to clear roads.

== See also ==
- List of Category 5 Atlantic hurricanes
- Other storms of the same name
- Hurricane Allen (1980)
- Hurricane Gilbert (1988)
- Hurricane Dean (2007)
- Tropical Storm Edouard (2020) – supplanted Emily as the earliest fifth named tropical storm
- Hurricane Grace (2021)
