= Mundo Lingo =

Social event

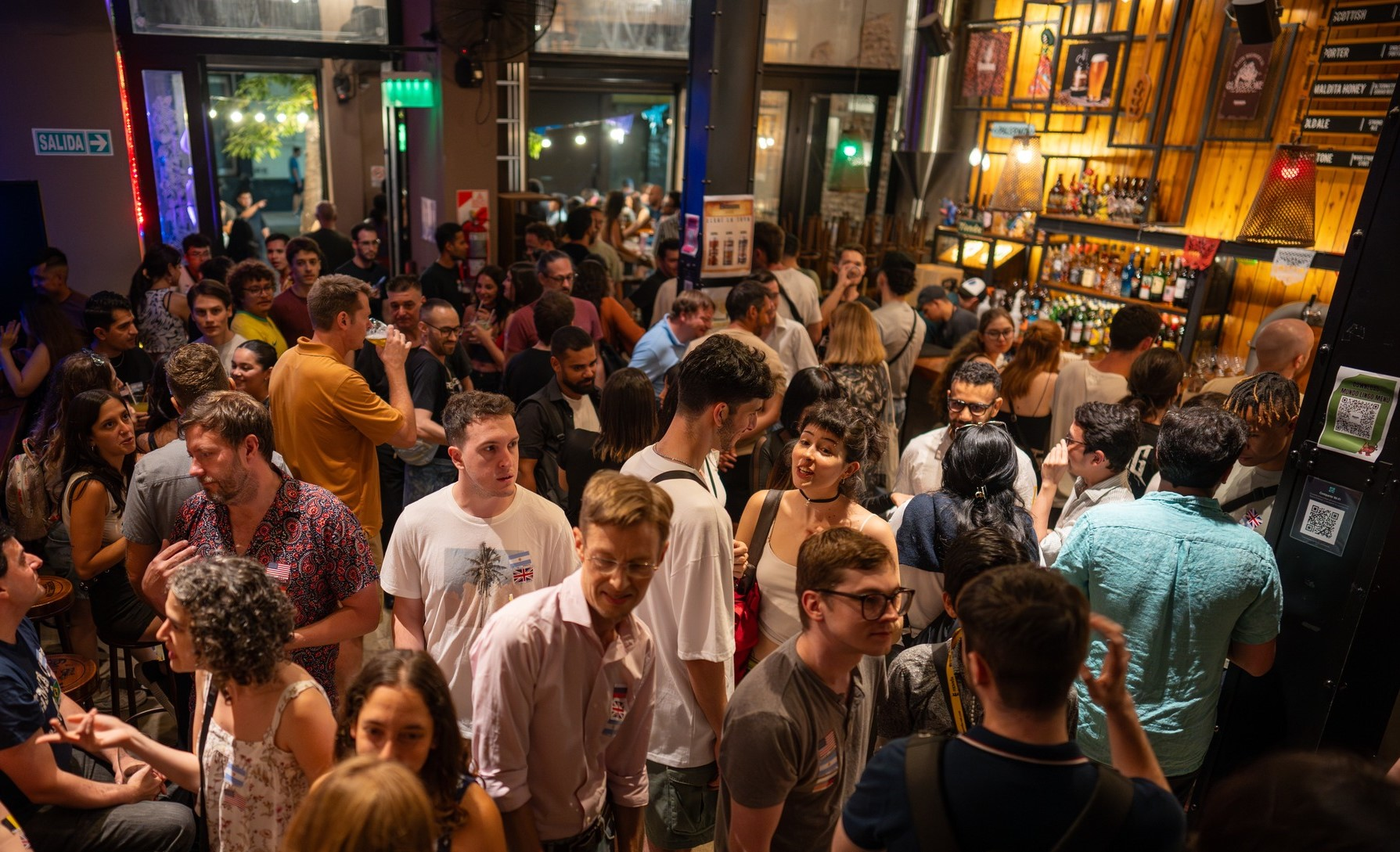
Mundo Lingo Buenos Aires

Mundo Lingo is an organization that hosts social events to connect locals and foreigners. These events are held in various cities around the world, are free of charge, and open to people of all nationalities. They take place in the evenings, from 7pm to 2am, at selected bars in each city. Mundo Lingo provides a relaxed and accessible environment for participants to enjoy the experience and connect with people from all over the world.

== Principle ==
When participants arrive at the bar, they are given self-adhesive flags to place on their clothing: their native language flag on top, and the flags of other languages they speak below, ordered by fluency level. Participants are free to make friends and socialize with whomever they wish, without intervention, in a relaxed atmosphere while enjoying drinks from the bar.

== History ==
The first Mundo Lingo event was initiated by Benji Moreira, a British citizen living in Buenos Aires (Argentina), It took place on July 7, 2011, with the goal of encouraging foreigners to socialize with locals by speaking in their native language or Spanish. Shortly after, around 50 people attended the events each week, and the flag system was introduced so participants could self-organize without direct intervention from the hosts. By 2014, the event gained popularity and expanded to cities such as Cologne, London, Montreal, and Melbourne.

In 2019, Mundo Lingo reached its peak with events in 30 cities worldwide before the events were suspended due to the global lockdowns in 2020.

In 2022, the meetings resumed in Rio de Janeiro and Buenos Aires, and gradually, the project began reopening in various cities, continuing its mission of connecting cultures through language.

== Financing ==
Mundo Lingo events are sustained by the participants' consumption at the bar. No commissions, business collaborations, or advertisements are accepted.

== Cities ==
As of January 2025, Mundo Lingo events are regularly held in 17 cities across 12 countries on 4 continents.

== America ==
Buenos Aires, Córdoba, Tucumán (Argentina), Rio de Janeiro, Florianópolis, São José dos Campos (Brazil), Mexico City and Playa del Carmen (Mexico), Montreal (Canada) and New York (United States).

== Europe and Asia ==
Málaga (Spain), Geneva (Switzerland), London (England), Paris (France), Belgrade (Serbia), Porto (Portugal) and Saigon (Vietnam)

== COVID-19 pandemic ==
Due to the COVID-19 pandemic, which forced the suspension of in-person events, the number of subscribers to Facebook and Telegram groups began to grow rapidly. As of January 2025, the Facebook groups have a total of more than 135,000 subscribers worldwide, while the Telegram groups have over 12,000 daily users. Information about active meetings can now be found in these groups and other platforms.
