= Playacar =

Seaside resort in Mexico

Coordinates: 20°37′N 87°05′W

Playacar is an upscale resort area of Playa del Carmen.

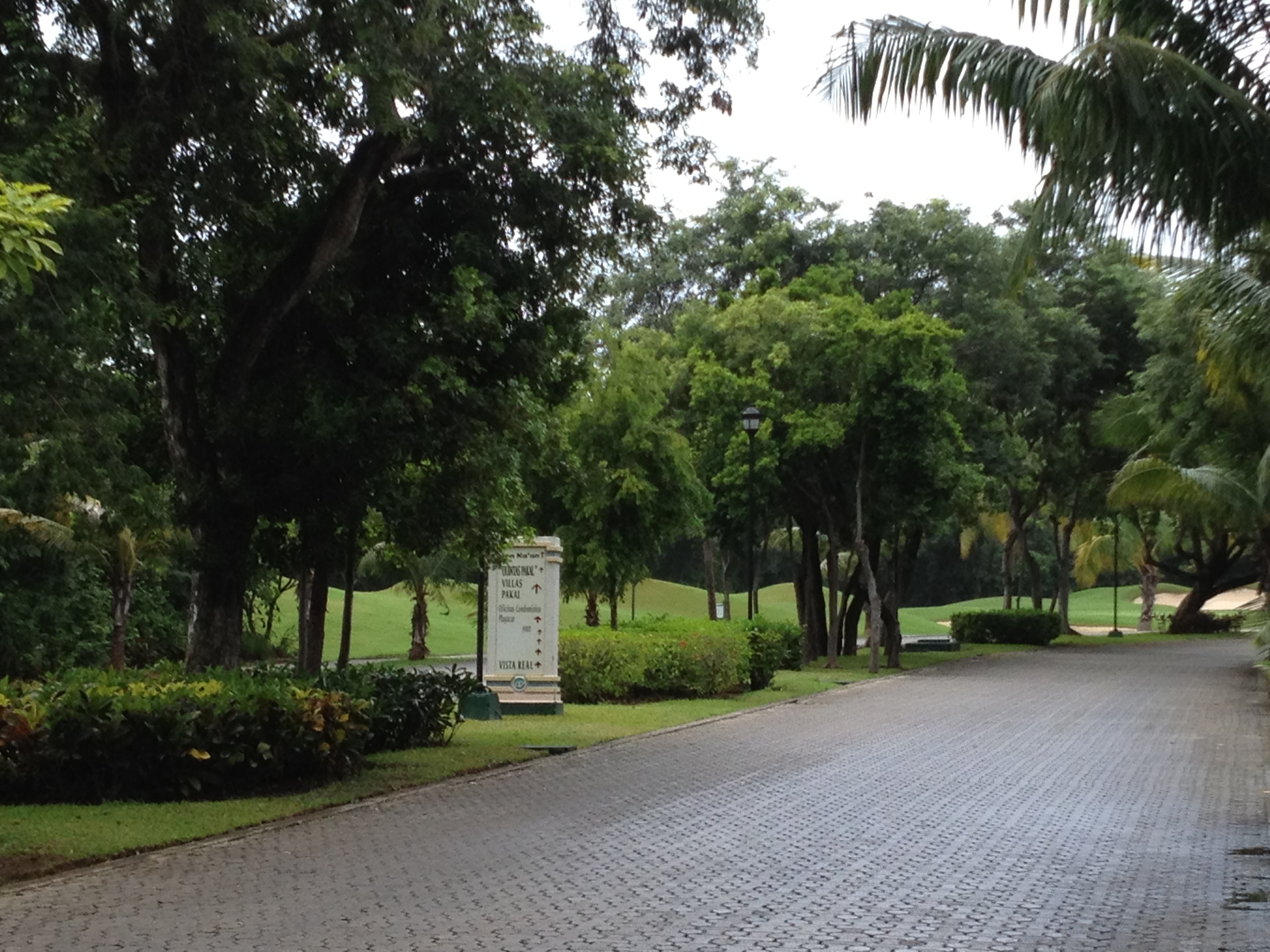
Calles de Playacar

Located in Playa del Carmen in the state of Quintana Roo, Mexico in the municipality of Solidaridad, it is a gated community that has grown with Playa del Carmen, just south of its main urban area. Playacar is approximately a 40 minute drive from Cancun.

It is composed of 2 sections: the first one, Playacar Phase 1 offers by-the-sea secluded beaches and villas, very close to downtown Playa del Carmen. The second, Playacar Phase II, was built around a golf course designed by Robert von Hagge, and exposes all-inclusive resorts and private villas all around.

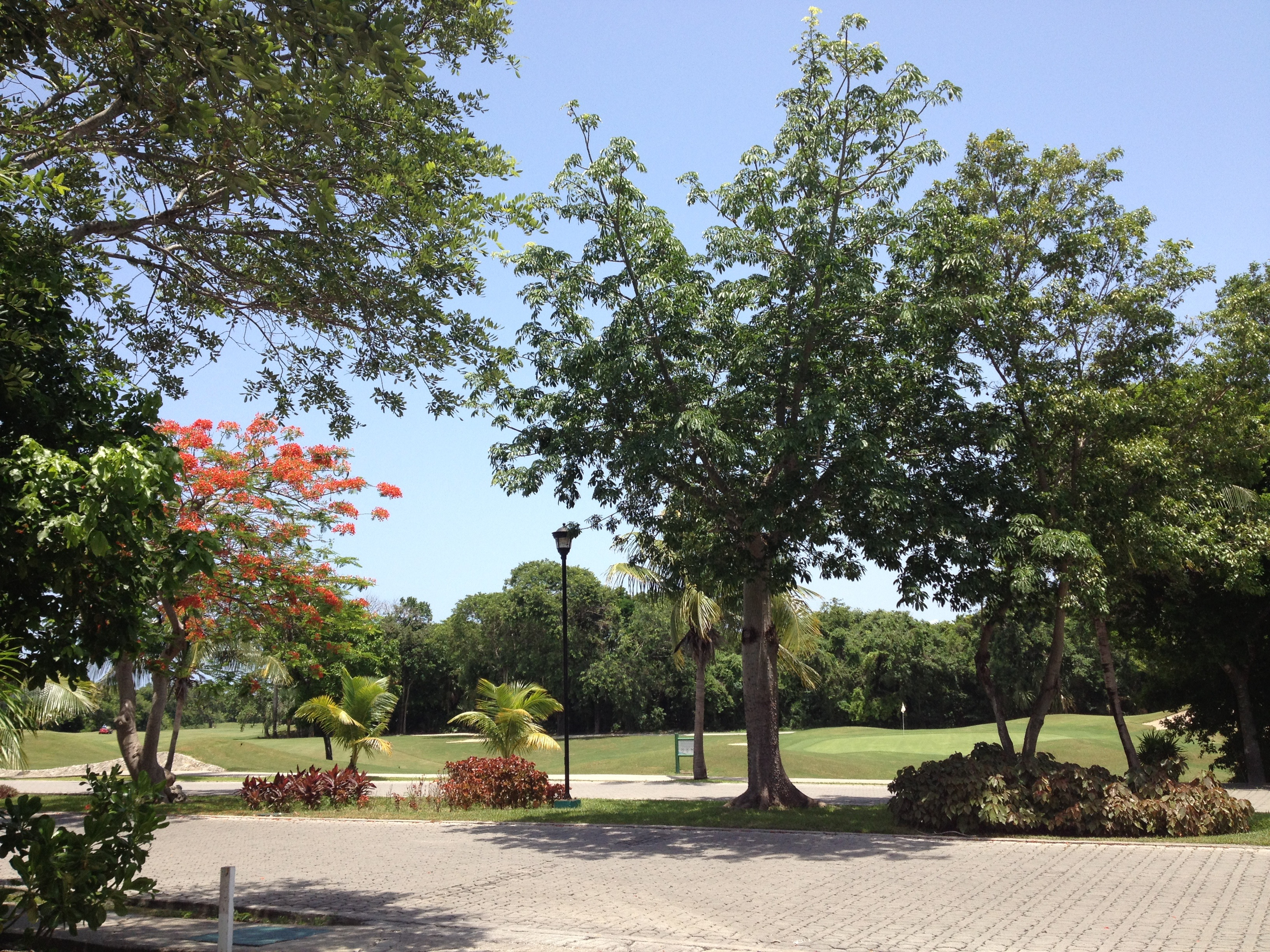
Paseo Xaman-Ha

== In popular culture ==
- In I Love New York, the section is used as a location for filming in the season finale.
