= Río Secreto =

Semi-flooded cave system in the Yucatan Peninsula, Mexico

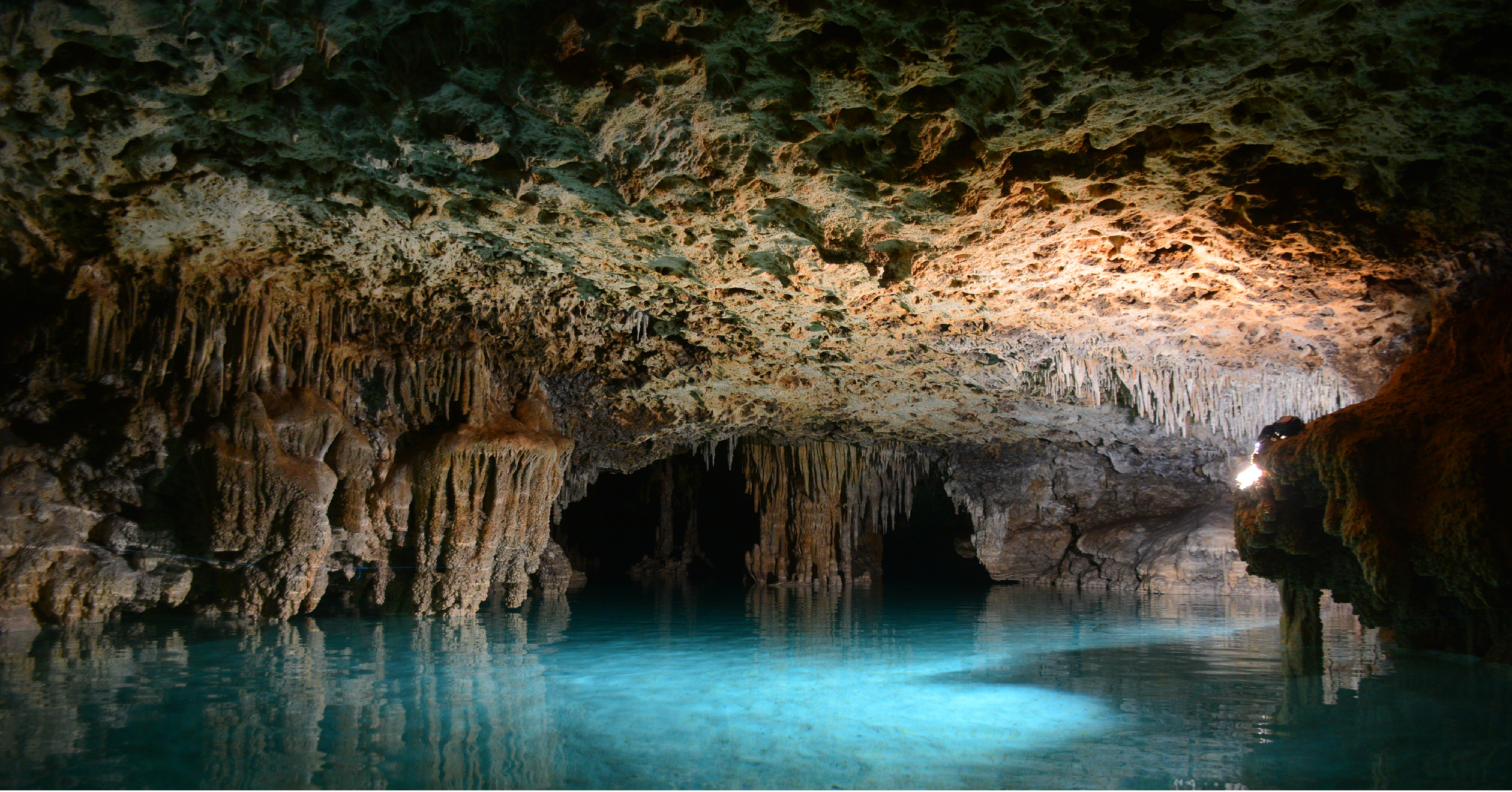
- Río Secreto

- Location within Mexico
- Location: Playa del Carmen, Quintana Roo, Mexico
- Coordinates: 20.588941°N 87.135198°W
- Length: 38 kilometers (24 mi)
- Discovery: 2004
- Geology: Limestone
- Entrances: several Cenotes

Río Secreto (English translation: Secret River) is a semi-flooded limestone cave system near Playa del Carmen, Quintana Roo, Mexico. There are 38 kilometers of caves in the system, of which approximately 10% are used for tourism. Currently, Río Secreto is protected as a nature reserve.

== History ==
=== Prehistory ===
As with other caves in the area, local Maya have known about the cave system and used it for ritualistic purposes hundreds of years ago. Various artifacts created by Maya peoples have been recovered from the cave system, including religious altars, cave paintings, and a vessel dating to the postclassic period.

=== Modern discovery ===
In 2004, a farmer discovered the cave after chasing an iguana into an entrance. A group of speleologists and divers from the area visited to map the caverns, defining routes and establishing their relationship with each other. During this period, the owners of the surface land were identified and a relationship with them was formed to create a comprehensive conservation plan. Formal exploration of the cave began in December 2006 and ended in September 2007, and the cave was opened to the public as a guided tour in April 2008. In 2016, Río Secreto had 104,000 tourists.

== Geology ==
The cave system is composed of limestone that has been hollowed out by millions of years of water erosion. Features include stalactites, stalagmites, stalagnates, pisolites, and helictites.

== Biology and ecosystem ==
The cave is home to many bats, silkworms, catfish, Mexican tetra, tarantulas, and amblypygi.
