= Riviera Maya Jazz Festival =

Annual music festival in Playa del Carmen, Mexico

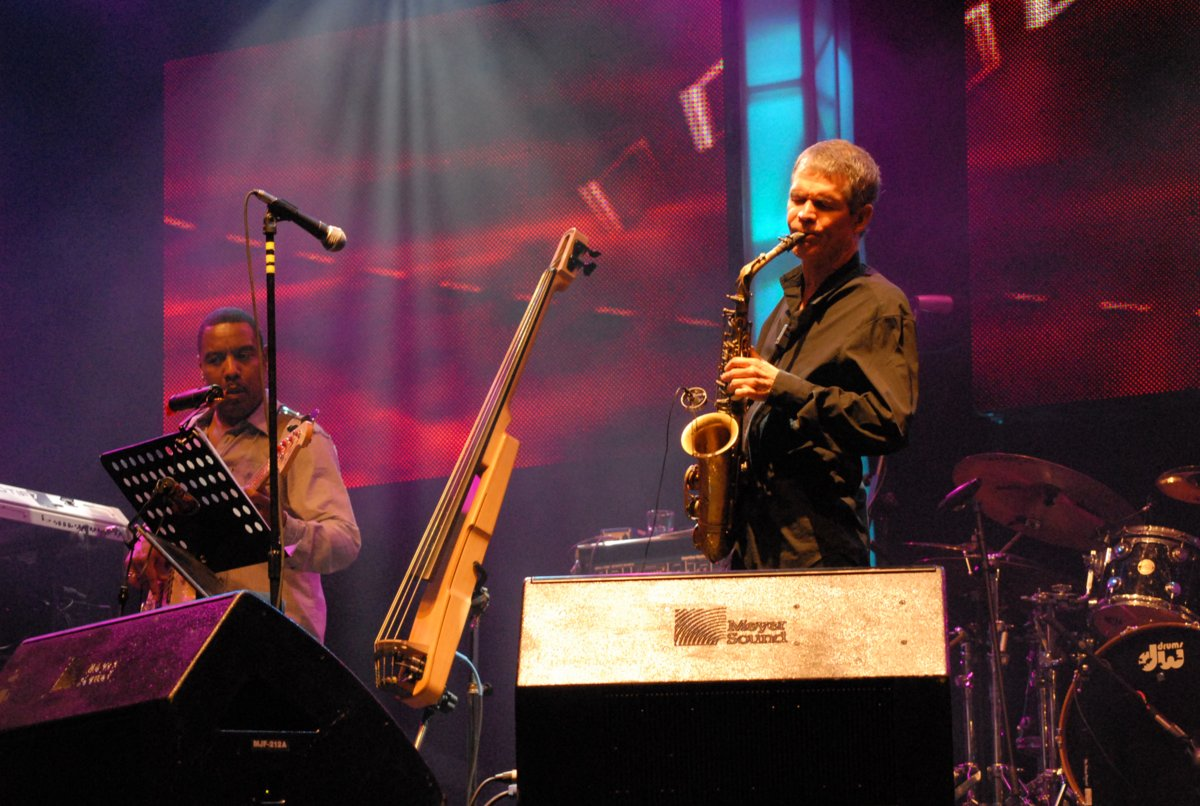
- Genre: Jazz festival
- Dates: November last weekend
- Locations: Playa del Carmen, Mexico
- Years active: 2003-present
- Attendance: 20,000
- Website: Official Website

The Riviera Maya Jazz Festival is an annual music festival hosted in Playa del Carmen, Mexico that was launched in 2003.

== Lineup ==
Some of the artists who have performed through the years are:

Benny Ibarra, Tower of Power, Marcus Miller, Los Dorados, George Benson, Pepe Mor n, H ctor Infanz n, Beaujean Project, Iraida Noriega, Earl Klugh, David Sanborn, Luca Littera, Sacb , Billy Cobham, Fourplay, Gino Vannelli, Colin Hunter, Na rimbo, Juan Alzate, Mark AAnderud, Enrique Neri, Jim Beard, Sergio Mendes, Spyro Gyra, Pat Martino, Herbie Hancock, Al Jarreau, Hiram G mez, Mike Stern, Dave Weckl, Ivan Lins, Luis Conte, Eldar Djangirov, Al Di Meola, Incognito, George Duke, John McLaughlin, The Manhattan Transfer, Yekina Pav n, Eugenia Le n, Armando Manzanero, Natalia Lafourcade, Jeff Lorber, Randy Brecker, Jon Anderson, Stanley Clarke, Alex Otaola, Richard Bona, Yellowjackets, Joe D Etienne, Pete Escovedo, Victor Wooten, Nortec, Poncho Sanchez, Level 42, Wayne Shorter, John Scofield, Frank Gambale, Brent Fisher, Scott Henderson, Jeff Berlin, Dennis Chambers, Ed Motta, Celso Pi a, Matthew Garrison, Earth, Wind & Fire

== Gallery ==
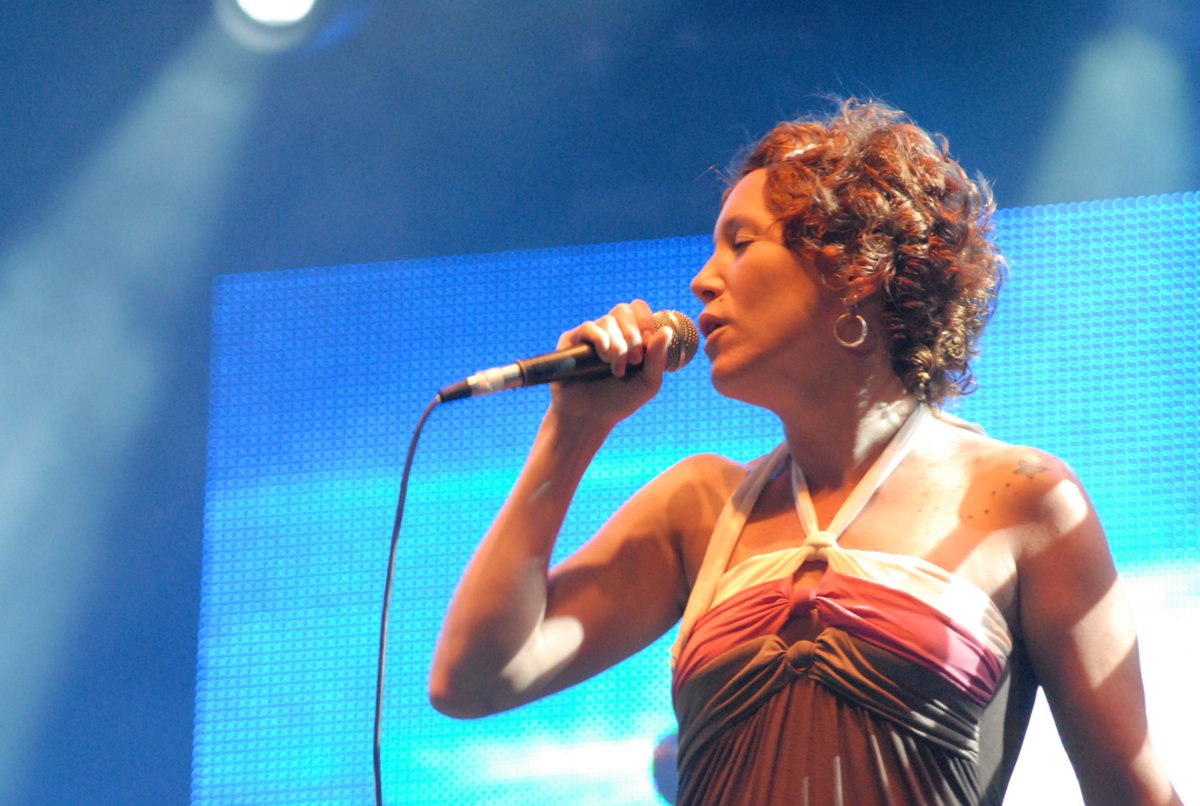

== See also ==
- List of jazz festivals in North America
