= Playa del Carmen =

City in Quintana Roo, Mexico

- City
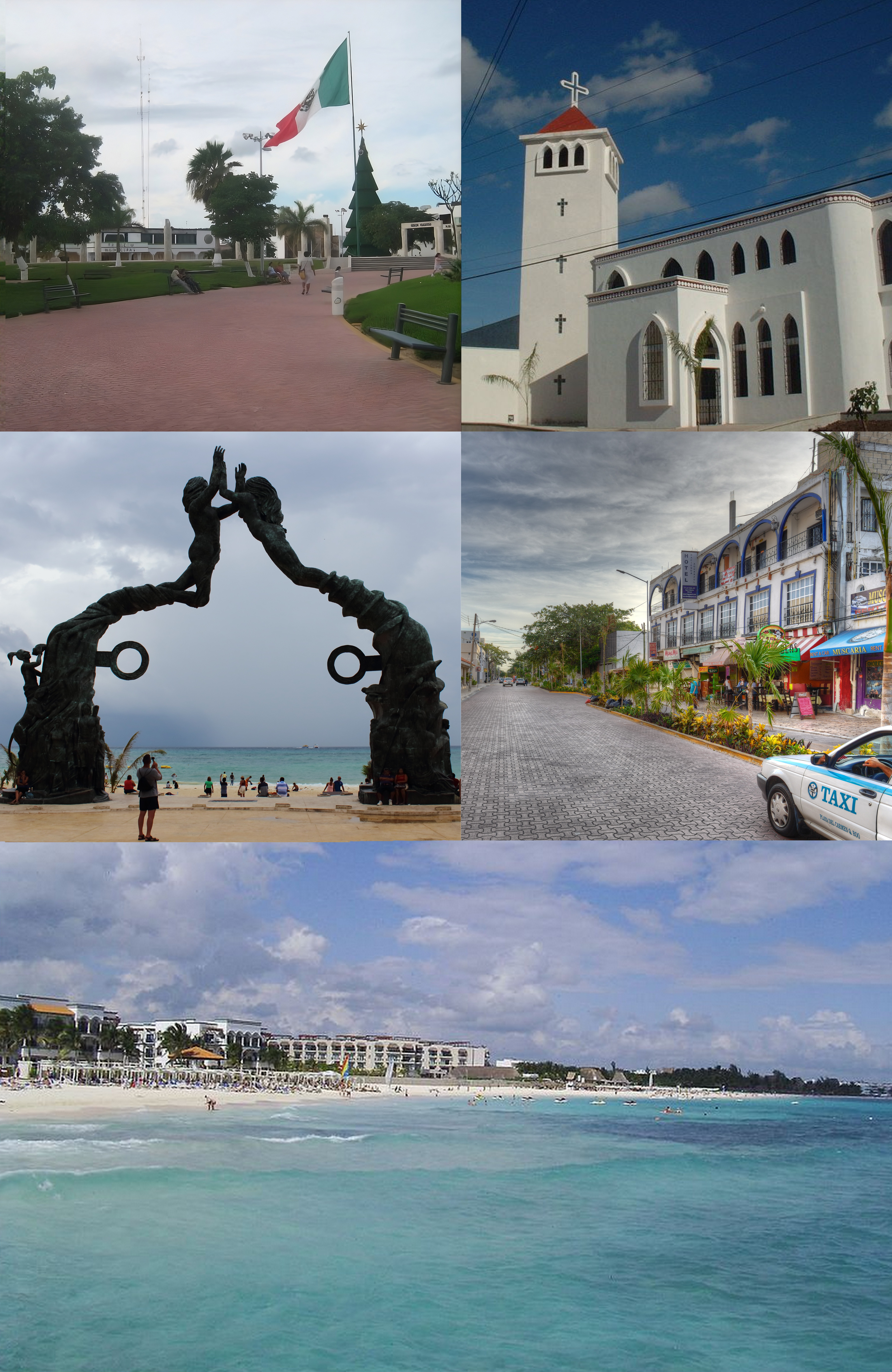
- Top: Plaza 28 de julio and local church Middle: Portal Maya sculpture and 10 Avenida Norte; Bottom: View of the beach
- Nicknames: Playa, PDC
- Location within Quintana Roo Location within Mexico
- Coordinates: 20°37′41″N 87°04′32″W
- Country: Mexico
- State: Quintana Roo
- Municipality: Playa del Carmen
- Founded: 1937

Government
  - Mayor: Estefanía Mercado

Area
  - Total: 49.8 km^{2} (19.2 sq mi)
- Elevation: 10 m (33 ft)

Population (2020)
  - Total: 304,942
  - Density: 6,120/km^{2} (15,900/sq mi)
- Demonym: Playense
- Time zone: UTC–05:00 (Zona Sureste)
- Postal codes: 77710, 77720
- Area code: +52 984
- Website: letsplaya.mx

Playa del Carmen is a resort city along the Caribbean Sea in the southeastern state of Quintana Roo, Mexico. It is part of the municipality of Playa del Carmen, and is around 68 kilometers away from Cancun. As of 2020, the city's population was just over 304,942, making it Quintana Roo’s second-largest city after Cancun.

Playa del Carmen is a popular tourist destination in Mexico's Riviera Maya region. Its current growth rate is set at 7.5% per year. According to Guinness World Records, it is one of Latin America's fastest-growing communities. In 2016, the city was the tenth-most popular international travel destination for U.S. travelers, and more than one million tourists passed through the city a year later. Playa's main airport is Cancún International Airport, which is around 70 kilometres (43 mi) away.

The area is known for its white sand beaches, turquoise waters, coral reefs, surrounding rainforests, and balnearios. The downtown area of the city revolves around Quinta Avenida, a busy pedestrian thoroughfare lined with shops, clubs, and restaurants. The weather is hot year-round. The summer and winter breaks are peak season for tourism.

== Geography ==
Playa del Carmen is within the Riviera Maya, which runs from south of Cancún to Tulum and the Sian Ka'an biosphere reserve. Playa is a stop for several cruise ships that dock at the nearby Calica quarry docks, about six miles (10 km) south of the city. The Xcaret Eco Park, a Mexican-themed "eco-archaeological park", is just south of the town in Xcaret (pronounced "ish-kar-et").

=== Climate ===
In October 2005, Hurricane Wilma passed directly over Playa del Carmen, remaining in the vicinity for two days and causing significant damage and a temporary drop in tourist arrivals. Most of the damage was relatively superficial and repaired within a few weeks. Wilma arrived from the Caribbean Sea, passing over Cozumel before making landfall in Playa del Carmen. It then moved north along the Mexican coast, hitting Cancún especially hard.

Playa del Carmen has a tropical savannah climate (Aw) with June to November receiving most of the precipitation. Summers are hot and year-round with warm nights.

Climate data for Playa del Carmen (1951–2010)
Month	Jan	Feb	Mar	Apr	May	Jun	Jul	Aug	Sep	Oct	Nov	Dec	Year
Record high °C (°F)	37.5 (99.5)	33.0 (91.4)	34.0 (93.2)	39.0 (102.2)	40.0 (104.0)	39.0 (102.2)	39.0 (102.2)	39.5 (103.1)	39.0 (102.2)	34.0 (93.2)	35.0 (95.0)	39.0 (102.2)	40.0 (104.0)
Mean daily maximum °C (°F)	27.8 (82.0)	28.5 (83.3)	29.6 (85.3)	30.8 (87.4)	31.7 (89.1)	32.0 (89.6)	32.5 (90.5)	32.9 (91.2)	32.6 (90.7)	30.8 (87.4)	29.3 (84.7)	28.6 (83.5)	30.6 (87.1)
Daily mean °C (°F)	22.8 (73.0)	23.4 (74.1)	24.3 (75.7)	26.1 (79.0)	27.3 (81.1)	27.9 (82.2)	28.0 (82.4)	28.0 (82.4)	27.9 (82.2)	26.3 (79.3)	24.4 (75.9)	23.4 (74.1)	25.8 (78.4)
Mean daily minimum °C (°F)	17.9 (64.2)	18.3 (64.9)	19.0 (66.2)	21.3 (70.3)	22.9 (73.2)	23.7 (74.7)	23.5 (74.3)	23.2 (73.8)	23.1 (73.6)	21.7 (71.1)	19.4 (66.9)	18.2 (64.8)	21.0 (69.8)
Record low °C (°F)	8.0 (46.4)	7.0 (44.6)	5.0 (41.0)	10.0 (50.0)	15.0 (59.0)	14.0 (57.2)	13.0 (55.4)	15.0 (59.0)	14.0 (57.2)	13.5 (56.3)	11.0 (51.8)	9.0 (48.2)	5.0 (41.0)
Average rainfall mm (inches)	61.2 (2.41)	50.5 (1.99)	28.1 (1.11)	51.2 (2.02)	78.1 (3.07)	153.0 (6.02)	126.3 (4.97)	126.3 (4.97)	168.8 (6.65)	284.3 (11.19)	130.3 (5.13)	73.1 (2.88)	1,331.2 (52.41)
Average rainy days (≥ 0.1 mm)	7.7	4.4	3.8	3.7	6.5	10.6	9.3	9.6	14.5	15.9	9.5	7.3	102.8
Source: Servicio Meteorológico Nacional

== Demographics ==
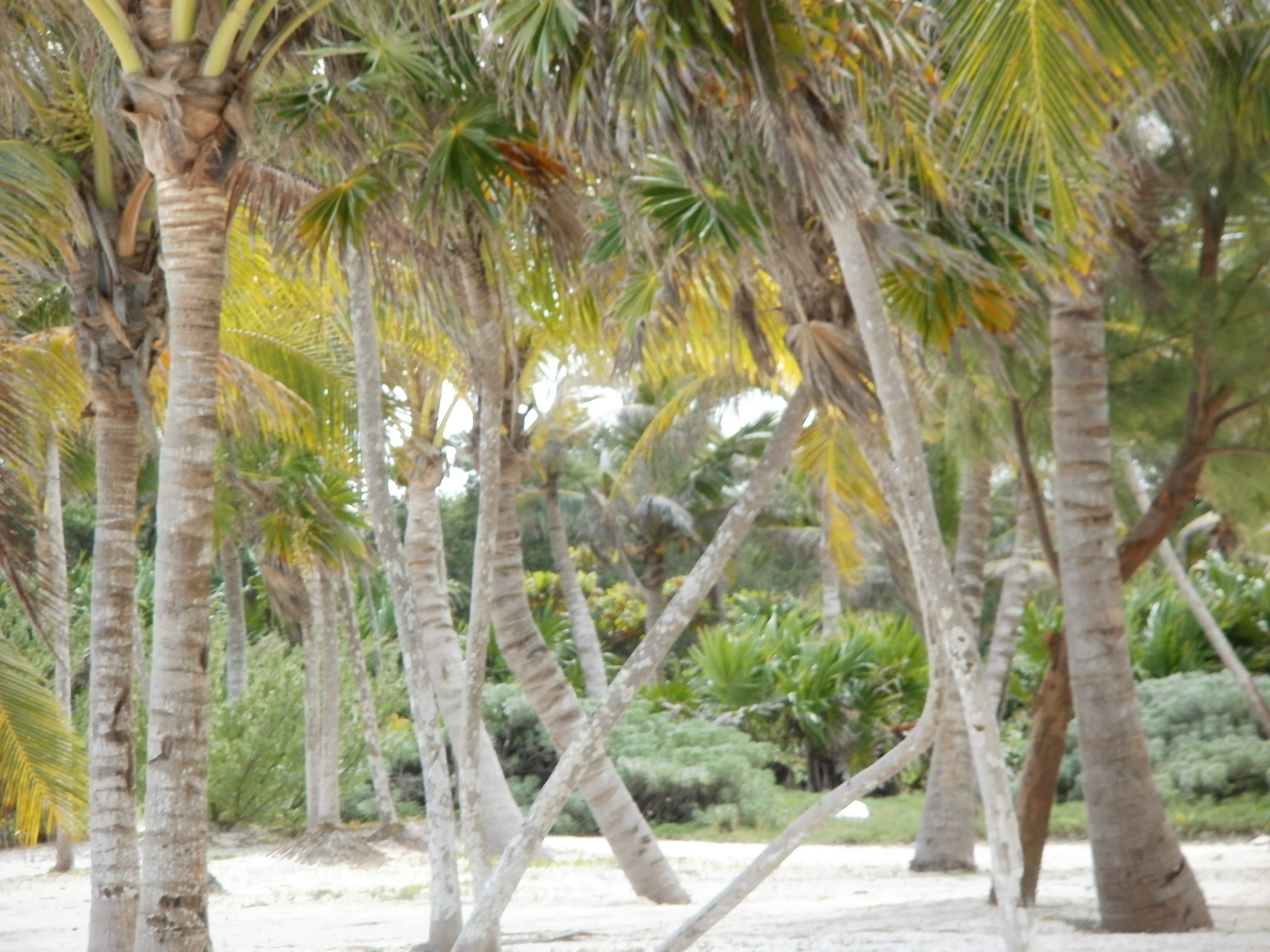
Various palm trees on white sand beach, Playa del Carmen

Historical population
Year	Pop.	±%
1995	17,621	—
2000	43,613	+147.5%
2005	100,383	+130.2%
2010	149,923	+49.4%
2014	186,700	+24.5%
2020	304,942	+63.3%

== Tourism ==
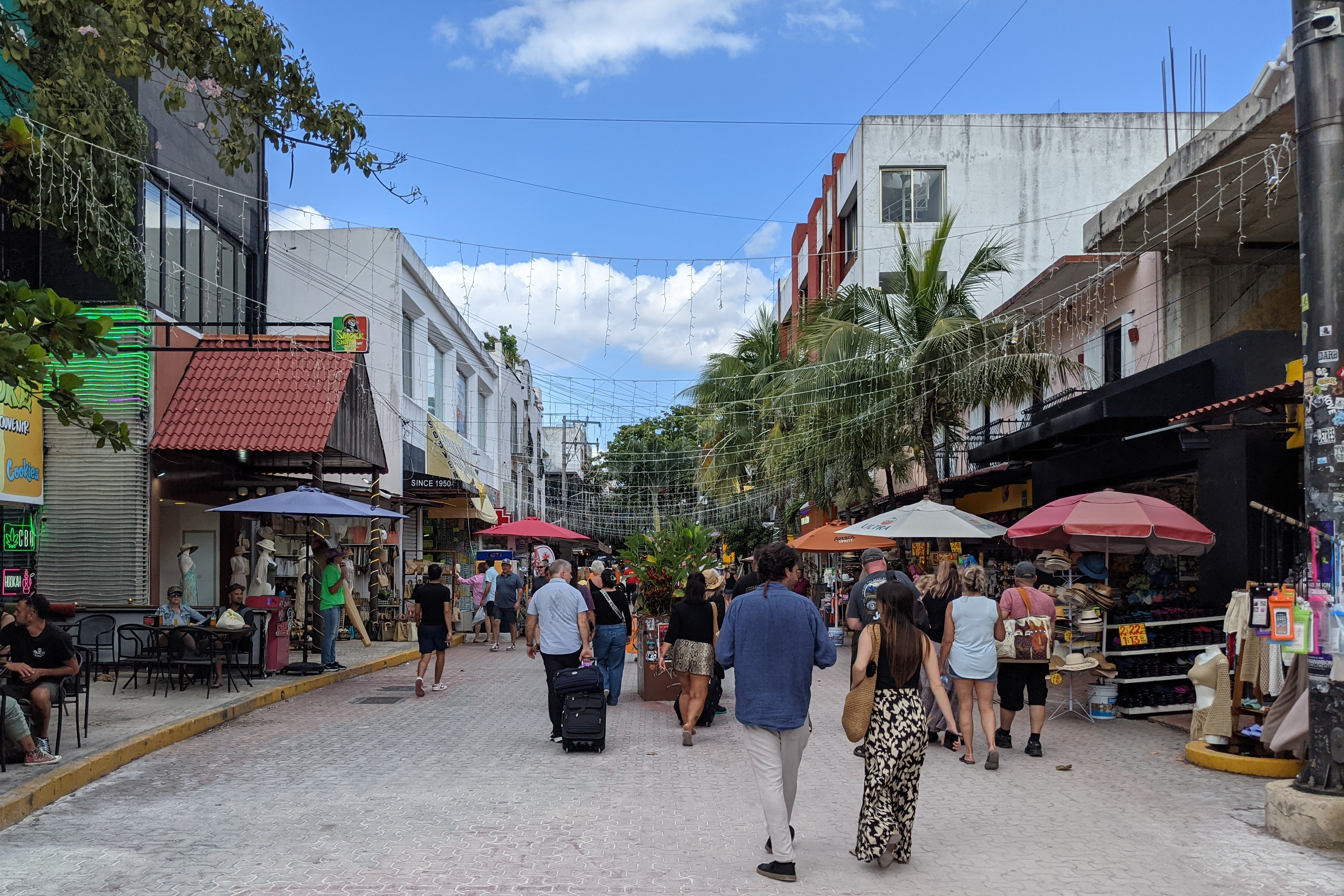
Quinta Avenida in Playa del Carmen

Originally a small fishing town, tourism to Playa del Carmen began with the passenger ferry service to Cozumel, an island across the Cozumel Channel and a scuba diving destination.

== Sports ==
The city is home to Inter Playa del Carmen, an association football club founded in 1999. It competes in the south group of the Segunda División Profesional, the third tier of Mexican football league system.

The World Wide Technology Championship at Mayakoba is a PGA Tour FedEx Cup golf tournament that was held at El Camaleón Golf Club between 2007 and 2023. Since 2013, it has been a full-points tournament where the winner earns full rights for a PGA TOUR win.

== In popular culture ==
Numerous TV series have been filmed and set in Playa del Carmen. The telenovela Peregrina takes place there. The Canadian Real Housewives of Vancouver featured Playa del Carmen in two episodes. The Amazing Race was shot on location in Playa del Carmen, and The Celebrity Mole was set in that area. The UK reality series Geordie Shore featured Playa del Carmen. In the American series Spies in Disguise, the Yakuza arms dealer named Katsu Kimura lies low in a Playa del Carmen hotel.

== See also ==
- Cenote
- Playacar
- Puerto Aventuras
- Río Secreto
- Riviera Maya Jazz Festival
- Montejo expedition – came to this site in 1528
