= Playa del Carmen (municipality) =

Playa del Carmen Municipality Municipio de Playa del Carmen
- Municipality
- Playa del Carmen
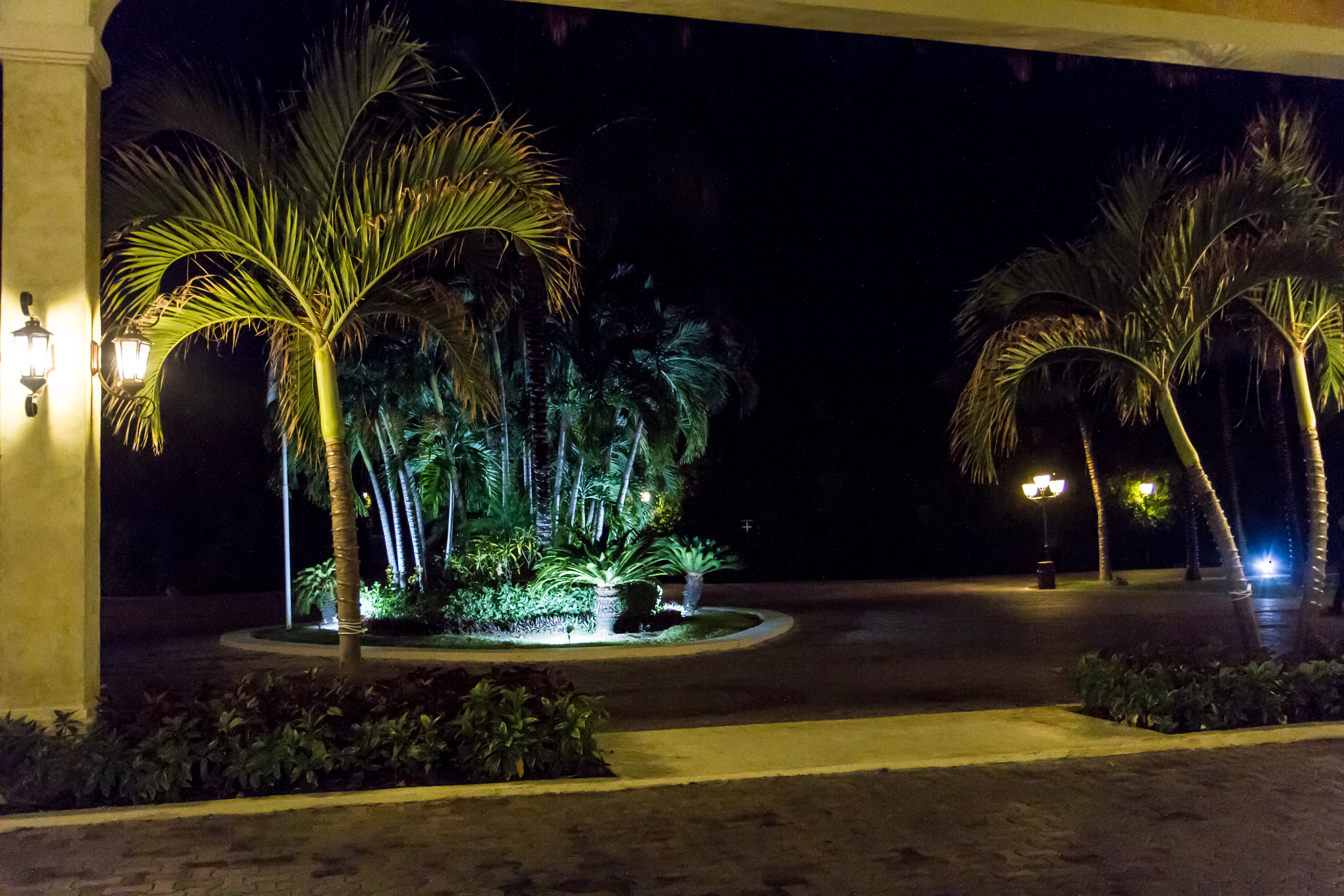
- Palm trees in Grand Palladium

- Flag Coat of arms

- Location of Playa del Carmenin Quintana Roo

- Location within Mexico
- Coordinates: 20°37′N 87°05′W
- Country: Mexico
- State: Quintana Roo
- Established: 28 July 1993
- Municipal seat: Playa del Carmen

Government
  - Municipal President: Lili Campos

Area
  - Municipality: 2,278 km^{2} (880 sq mi)
- Elevation: 10 m (33 ft)

Population (2020 census)
  - Municipality: 333,800
  - Density: 146.5/km^{2} (379.5/sq mi)
  - Urban: 155,902
- Time zone: UTC−05:00 (Zona Sureste)
- Area code: 984
- INEGI Code: 23008
- Website: https://playadelcarmen.gob.mx/

Playa del Carmen (formerly Solidaridad) is one of the eleven municipalities that make up the Mexican state of Quintana Roo. Its municipal seat is the town of Playa del Carmen.

Playa del Carmen is home to the Maya archaeological site of Xcaret.

== Geography ==
The municipality has some small but rich continental sites including the ecotourism park of Xcaret. Prior to the creation of the Municipality of Tulum, the municipality was situated between latitudes 20° 45' and 19° 46' north and longitudes 86° 57' and 88° 05' west, and had an area of 4,245.67 square kilometres (1,639.26 sq mi). Today, it borders the municipalities of Benito Juárez and Lázaro Cárdenas to the north and Tulum to the south; and is separated in most places from its neighboring municipality to the east (Cozumel) by a stretch of the Caribbean Sea known as the Cozumel Channel.

The ecotourism park of Xel-Ha and the Calica limestone quarry are not part of Playa del Carmen as they belong to the neighboring municipality of Cozumel. These are the only two mainland locations for the municipality of Cozumel with sizes of 90 hectares (220 acres) and 11.9 hectares (29 acres) respectively. All of the limestone from Calica is exported to the US, and the quarry has its own docks and also serves visiting cruise ships.

=== Orography and hydrography ===
Like most of the Yucatan Peninsula, Playa del Carmen is almost entirely flat with a gentle slope towards the sea, so from west to east, most of the area never reaches an altitude above 25 metres (82 ft) above sea level.

Like the rest of the peninsula's surface the land has a limestone base that does not allow the formation of surface water flows such as rivers and streams, the water instead form flows in underground rivers that sometimes rise to the surface in the cenotes. Lakes and cenotes are the major water bodies of the municipality.

=== Communities ===
The largest localities (cities, towns, and villages) are:

| Name | Population (2010 census) |
|---|---|
| Playa del Carmen | 149,923 |
| Puerto Aventuras | 5,979 |
| Barceló Maya | 606 |
| Grand Palladium | 334 |
| Cárcel Pública | 314 |
| Iberostar | 242 |
| Felipe Carrillo Puerto | 176 |
| Punta Laguna | 138 |
| El Dorado | 131 |
| Hidalgo y Cortez | 128 |
| Grand Sirenis | 125 |
| Total municipality | 159,310 |

== History ==
Playa del Carmen is one of the youngest municipalities in the country: it was formed on July 28, 1993, by decree of the State Congress during the administration of Mario Villanueva Madrid. At this time the municipality of Cozumel was split into two, with the mainland section constituting the new municipality of Solidaridad. On March 13, 2008, Playa del Carmen was split in two when the new Municipality of Tulum was formed, as a result its land area and population were adjusted. Solidaridad changed its name to Playa del Carmen on March 19, 2025.

Historical population
| Year | Pop. | ±% p.a. |
|---|---|---|
| 1995 | 28,747 | — |
| 2000 | 63,752 | +17.27% |
| 2005 | 135,512 | +16.28% |
| 2010 | 159,310 | +3.29% |
Source: INEGI Instituto Nacional de Estadística y Geografía

== Demographics ==
The municipality has a population of 159,310 according to the results of the Population and Housing Census of 2010 conducted by the National Institute of Statistics and Geography (Instituto Nacional de Estadística y Geografía), of these, 83,468 are men and 75,842 are women. By this time, Tulum Municipality was already separated from Solidaridad.

Currently most of its population are immigrants, mainly from the southeastern states of Mexico; but also, according to the National Institute of Migration, Mexico (Instituto Nacional de Migración de México), the municipality has 12 percent of its population of foreign origin.

Playa del Carmen, seat of the municipality
