= Puerto Aventuras =

Human settlement in Mexico

- Locality
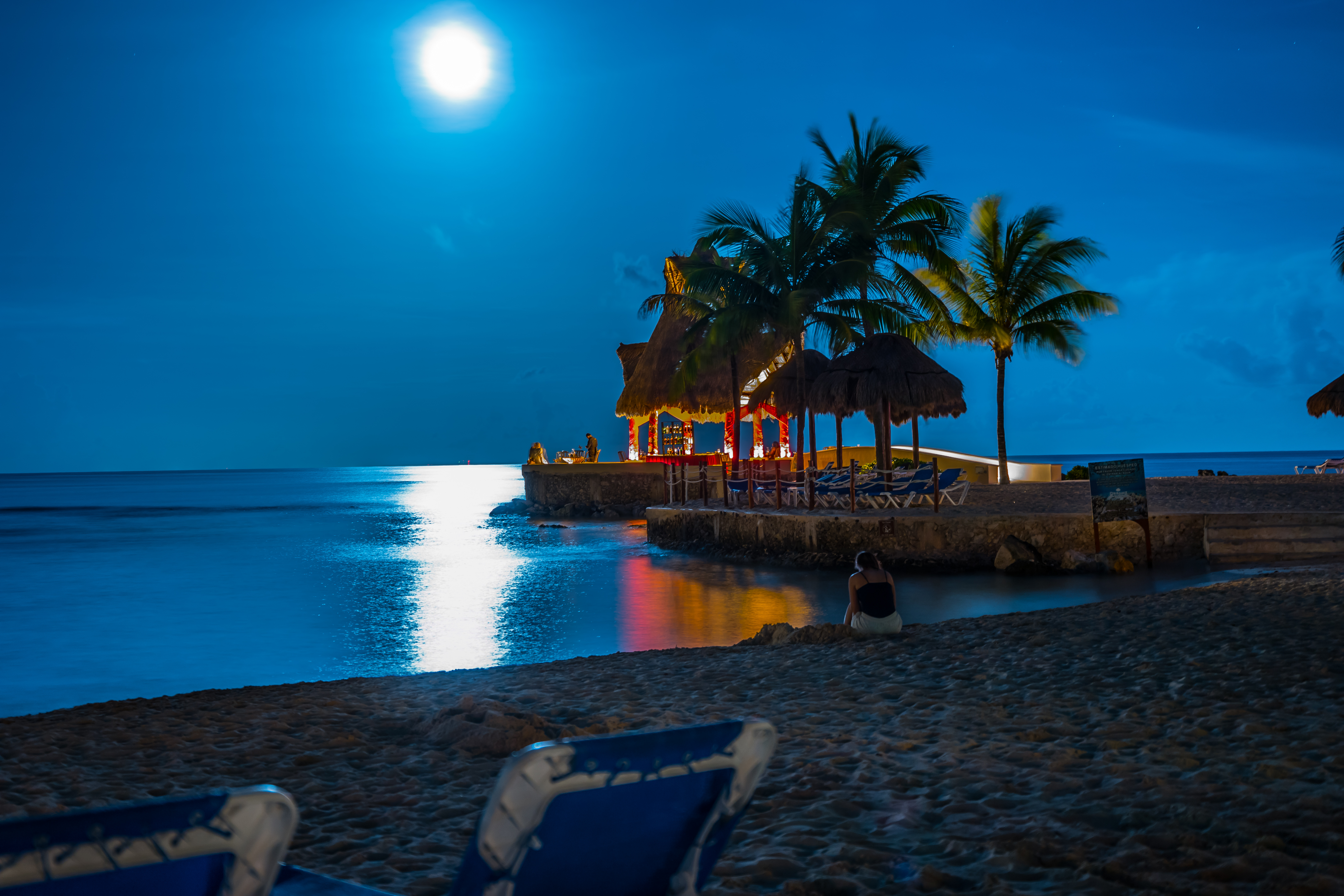
- Beach in Puerto Aventuras

- Location within Mexico
- Coordinates: 20°30′42″N 87°14′03″W
- Country: Mexico
- State: Quintana Roo
- Municipality: Solidaridad

Population (2020)
  - Total: 22,878
- Time zone: UTC-5 (Southeast (US Eastern))

Puerto Aventuras (Spanish pronunciation: ['pweɾto aβen'tuɾas]) is a community located in Solidaridad Municipality, Quintana Roo, Mexico. It had a 2020 census population of 22,878 inhabitants, and is located at an elevation of 9 metres (30 ft) above sea level. It is the second-largest community in Solidaridad Municipality, after the municipal seat, Playa del Carmen.

Puerto Aventuras is divided into two parts: west of Highway 307 is the residential subdivision, east of Highway 307 along the Caribbean coast is the tourist zone with hotels and resorts, part of the Riviera Maya.

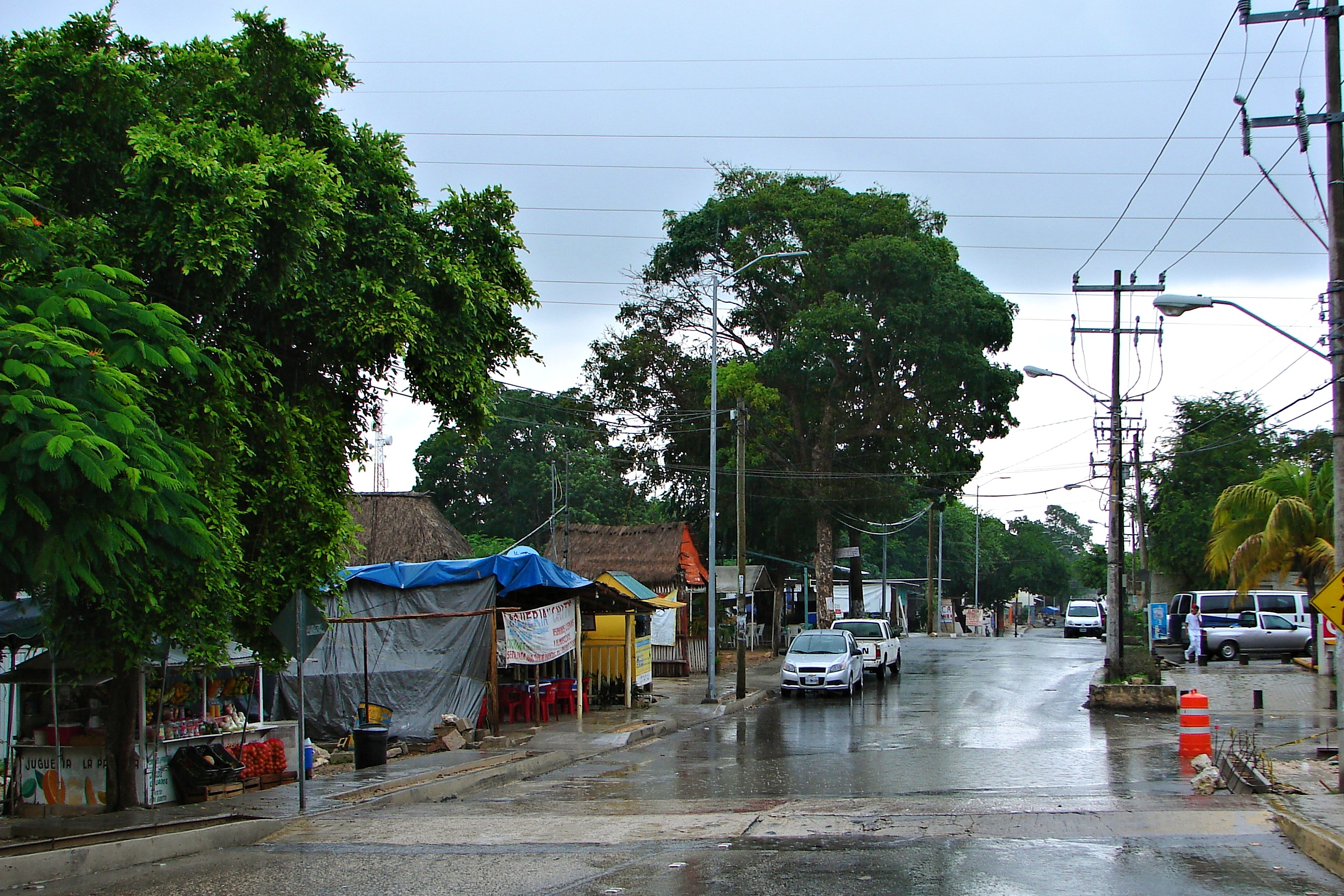
View of Puerto Aventuras west of Highway 307

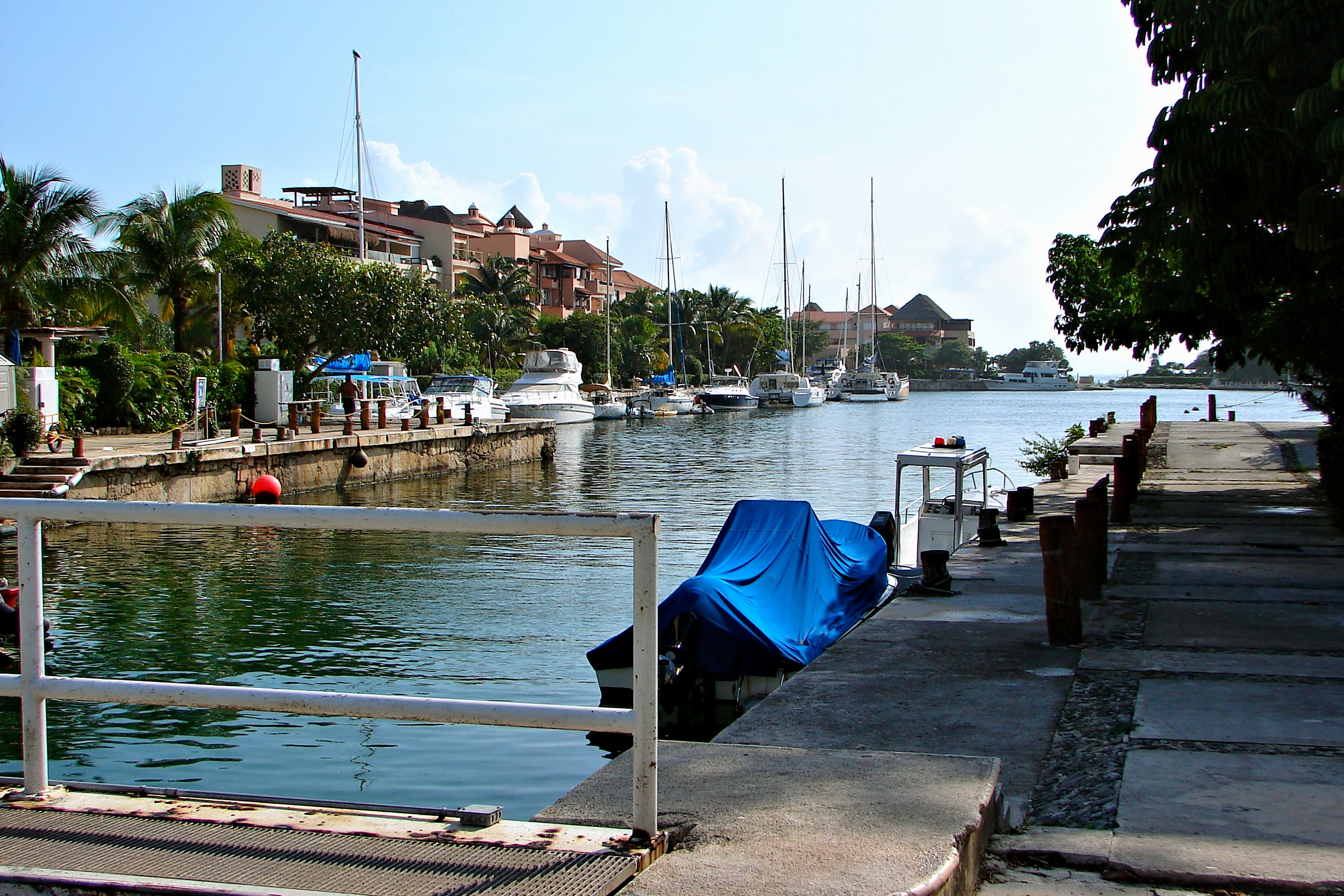
Puerto Aventuras east of Highway 307 (tourist and resort area)

== Recreational activities ==
Some of the recreational activities available in Puerto Aventuras include: golf, tennis, sportfishing, snorkeling, scuba diving, swimming with dolphins and manatees, and visiting some of the many nearby cenotes.
