= Calica =

Quarry and port in Mexico

Coordinates: 20.573°N 87.127°W

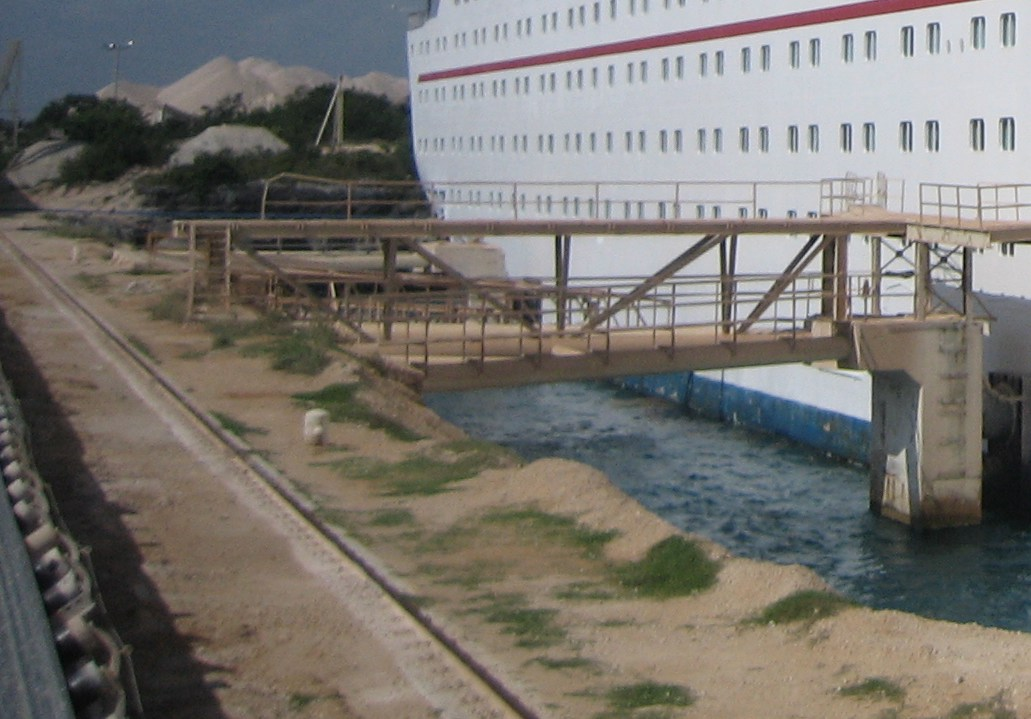
Cruise ship docked at Calica. Note piles of aggregate in the background.

Calica is a quarry and a port on the Quintana Roo coast of Mexico. The name is short for the full Spanish name Calizas Industriales del Carmen, "calizas" Spanish for lime or limestone (cognate to the English "calcite.")

Ultramar and Transcaribe operate car ferries to Cozumel from the port.

The port is also used to dock ships for loading aggregate (gravel and sand) used for construction. The Calica quarry was originally part of a joint venture between Vulcan Materials Company and Grupo ICA, but Vulcan purchased Grupo ICA interest in 2001. The Calica site has a port blasted directly into the limestone to accommodate deep draft vessels needed to ship the limestone to the US. All of the limestone from Calica, approx. 12 million tons annually, is exported to the US.

The Calica port itself has little or no services or hotels. Just north of the port is the "ecological theme park" of Xcaret, a Mayan tourist destination, archaeological site, and beach.

Although situated on the continental mainland of the Yucatán Peninsula, the Calica facilities are not part of the surrounding municipio (municipality) of Solidaridad. The site (An area of some 11.9ha) along with another neighboring mainland location Xel-Ha is part of the municipality of Cozumel, which has the rest of its land on the island of the same name approximately 20 km (12.4 mi) offshore to the east on the other side of the Cozumel Channel in the Caribbean Sea.

Carnival Cruise Lines, the world's largest cruise operator, announced in March 2012 that the company intends to build a cruise terminal at the Calica port, part of an investment in Mexican port infrastructure estimated at US$150 million.

== See also ==
- List of ports and harbours of the Atlantic Ocean
