= Dominica Red Cross Society =

- Founded: 1981
- Type: Non-profit organisation
- Purpose: Humanitarian Aid
- Location: Dominica
- Affiliations: International Committee of the Red Cross; International Federation of Red Cross and Red Crescent Societies

The Dominica Red Cross Society established as a branch of the British Red Cross on 28 January 1958 and recognized as a national Society on 7 March 1983.

On 28 September 1981 a declaration of succession to the Geneva Conventions of 1949 was signed with Protocols I and II additional to the Geneva Conventions acceded to on 25 April 1996.

Recognized by the International Committee of the Red Cross on 15 March 1989 and by the International Federation of Red Cross and Red Crescent Societies on 21 October 1989.
