= Coba (disambiguation) =

Coba is the archeological site of Pre-Columbian Maya civilization, in the state of Quintana Roo, Mexico.

Coba may also refer to:

== Acronyms ==
- Cob(I)yrinic acid a,c-diamide adenosyltransferase, an enzyme
- Uroporphyrinogen-III C-methyltransferase, an enzyme
- College of Business Administration (disambiguation)
- Cost–benefit analysis

== People ==
- Yasuhiro Kobayashi (born 1959), a Japanese musician known professionally as coba

=== Given name ===
- Coba da Costa (born 2002), Spanish footballer
- Coba Ritsema (1876–1961), portrait painter from the Netherlands
- Coba Surie (1879–1970), Dutch painter
- Coba van der Lee (1893-1972), Dutch artist

=== Surname ===
- Camilo Coba (born 1986), Ecuadorian filmmaker and photographer
- Máel Coba mac Áedo (died 615), Irish king
  - Cellach mac Máele Coba (died 658), Irish king, son of Máel Coba
- Mehdi Çoba (born 2000), Albanian footballer
- Ndoc Çoba (1870–1945), Albanian Minister of Finances in 1920
- Selim Çoba (died 1900), Albanian religious scholar
- Shaqe Çoba (1875–1954), Albanian feminist and suffragist

== Other uses ==
- Coba Lake, Mexico
- Coba Höyük, also known as Sakçe Gözü or Sakçagözü, an archaeological site in Anatolia, Turkey
- Coba Coba, an album from the Peruvian band Novalima

== See also ==
- Cobas (disambiguation)
