= Coba =

Pre-Columbian Maya site in the northeastern Yucatán peninsula

Cobá
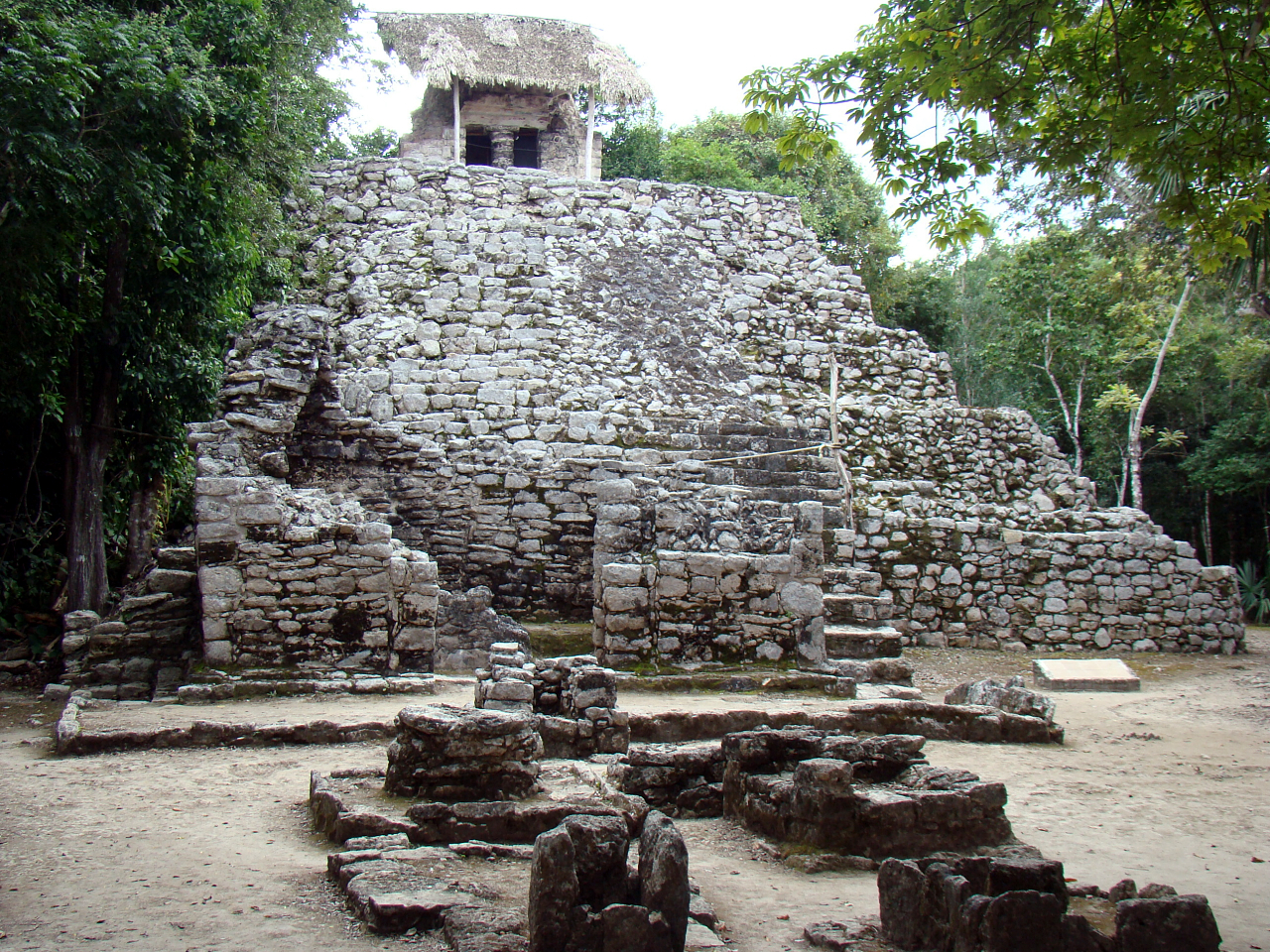
- Coba archaeological area

- Location within Mesoamerica Location within Quintana Roo
- 20°29′24″N 87°43′55″W
- Periods: Late Preclassic to Late Postclassic
- Cultures: Maya civilization
- Location: Quintana Roo, Mexico
- Region: Yucatán Peninsula

Site notes
- Condition: In ruins

Coba (Spanish: Cobá) is an ancient Maya city on the Yucatán Peninsula, located in the Mexican state of Quintana Roo. The site is the nexus of the largest network of stone causeways of the ancient Maya world, and it contains many engraved and sculpted stelae that document ceremonial life and important events of the Late Classic Period (600–900 AD) of Mesoamerican civilization. The adjacent modern village bearing the same name, reported a population of 1,278 inhabitants in the 2010 Mexican federal census.

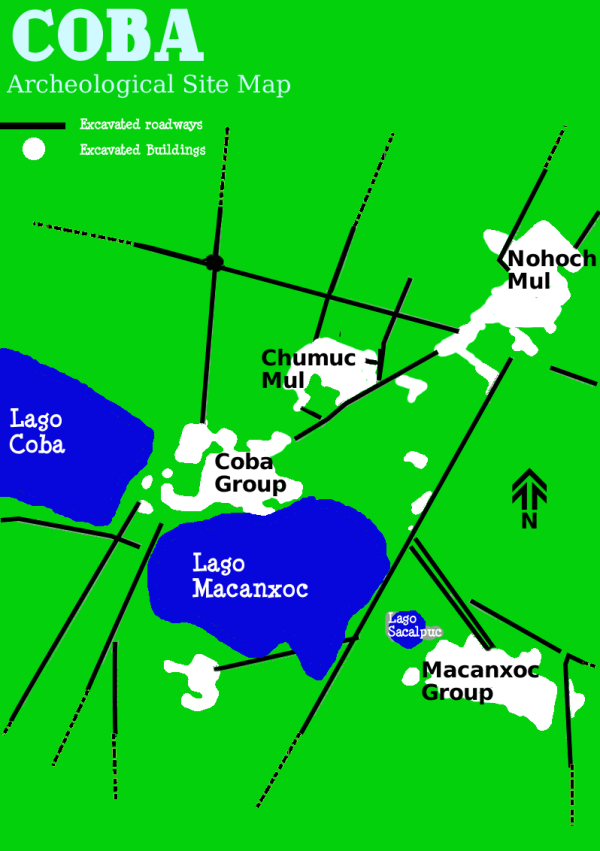
Map of the Cobá archeological site

The ruins of Coba lie 47 km (approx. 29 mi) northwest of Tulum, in the State of Quintana Roo, Mexico. The geographical coordinates of Coba Group (main entrance for tourist area of the archaeological site) are North 19° 29.6' and West 87° 43.7'. The archaeological zone is reached by a two-kilometer branch from the asphalt road connecting Tulum with Nuevo Xcán (a community of Lázaro Cárdenas, another municipality of Quintana Roo) on the Valladolid to Cancún highway.

Coba is located around two lagoons, Lake Coba and Lake Macanxoc. A series of elevated stone and plaster roads radiate from the central site to various smaller sites near and far. These are known by the Maya term sacbe (plural sacbeob) or white road. Some of these causeways go east, and the longest runs over 100 kilometres (62 mi) westward to the site of Yaxuna. The site contains a group of large temple pyramids known as the Nohoch Mul, the tallest of which, Ixmoja, is some 42 metres (138 ft) in height. Ixmoja is among the tallest pyramids on the Yucatán peninsula, exceeded by Calakmul at 45 metres (148 ft).

Coba was estimated to have had some 50,000 inhabitants (and possibly significantly more) at its peak of civilization, and the built up area extends over some 80 km^{2} (31 sq mi). The site was occupied by a sizable agricultural population by the first century. The bulk of Coba's major construction seems to have been made in the middle and late Classic period, about 500 to 900 AD, with most of the dated hieroglyphic inscriptions from the 7th century (see Mesoamerican Long Count calendar). However, Coba remained an important site in the Post-Classic era and new temples were built and old ones kept in repair until at least the 14th century, possibly as late as the arrival of the Spanish.

Cobá lies in the tropics, subject to alternating wet and dry seasons which, on average, differ somewhat from those in the rest of the northern peninsula, where the rainy season generally runs from June through October and the dry season from November through May. At Cobá, rain can occur in almost any time of the year, but there is a short dry period in February and March, and a concentration of rain from September through November.

== Sakbe'ob ==
Sakbe'ob (Maya plural of sacbe), or sacbes, are very common at Coba. They are raised pathways lined with stones on each side and filled with smaller stones and lined with sand, shell, and/or plaster on top. These paths were the connecting points to most areas of Coba. Although the Maya used wheels in artifacts such as toys, anthropologists note that without indigenous animals suitable for draft, they did not implement the wheel for transportation of goods or people.

== History ==
Archaeological evidence indicates that Cobá was first settled between 50 BC and 100 AD. At that time, there was a town with buildings of wood and palm fronds and flat platforms. The only archaeological evidence of the time are fragments of pottery. After 100 AD, the area around Coba evidenced strong population growth, and with it an increase in its social and political status among Maya city states which would ultimately make Coba one of the biggest and most powerful city states in the northern Yucatán area. Between 201 and 601 AD, Coba must have dominated a vast area, including the north of the state of Quintana Roo and areas in the east of the state of Yucatán. This power resided in its control of large swaths of farmland, control over trading routes, and—critically for a Maya city—control over ample water resources. Among the trading routes, Coba probably controlled ports like Xel Há.

Coba maintained close contacts with the large city states in what is now Guatemala and the south of Campeche like Tikal, Dzibanche, or Calakmul. To maintain its influence, Coba established military alliances and arranged marriages among their elites. It is quite noteworthy that Coba shows traces of Teotihuacan architecture, like a platform in the Paintings group that was explored in 1999, which would attest of the existence of contacts with the central Mexican cultures and its powerful city of the early Classic epoch. Stelae uncovered at Coba are believed to document that Coba had many women as rulers, Ajaw.

After 600 AD, the emergence of powerful city states of the Puuc culture and the emergence of Chichén Itzá altered the political spectrum in the Yucatán peninsula and began eroding the dominance of Coba. Beginning around 900 or 1000 AD, Coba must have begun a lengthy power struggle with Chichén Itzá, with the latter dominating at the end as it gained control of key cities such as Yaxuná. After 1000 AD, Coba lost much of its political weight among city states, although it maintained some symbolic and religious importance. This allowed it to maintain or recover some status, which is evidenced by the new buildings dating to the time 1200–1500 AD, now built in the typical Eastern coastal style. However, power centers and trading routes had moved to the coast, forcing cities like Coba into a secondary status, although somewhat more successful than its more ephemeral enemy Chichén Itzá. Coba was abandoned by the time the Spanish conquered the peninsula.

=== Rulers ===
The names of fourteen leaders, including a woman named Yopaat, who ruled Cobá between 500 and 780 AD, were ascertained in 2020.

== Exploration and artifacts ==
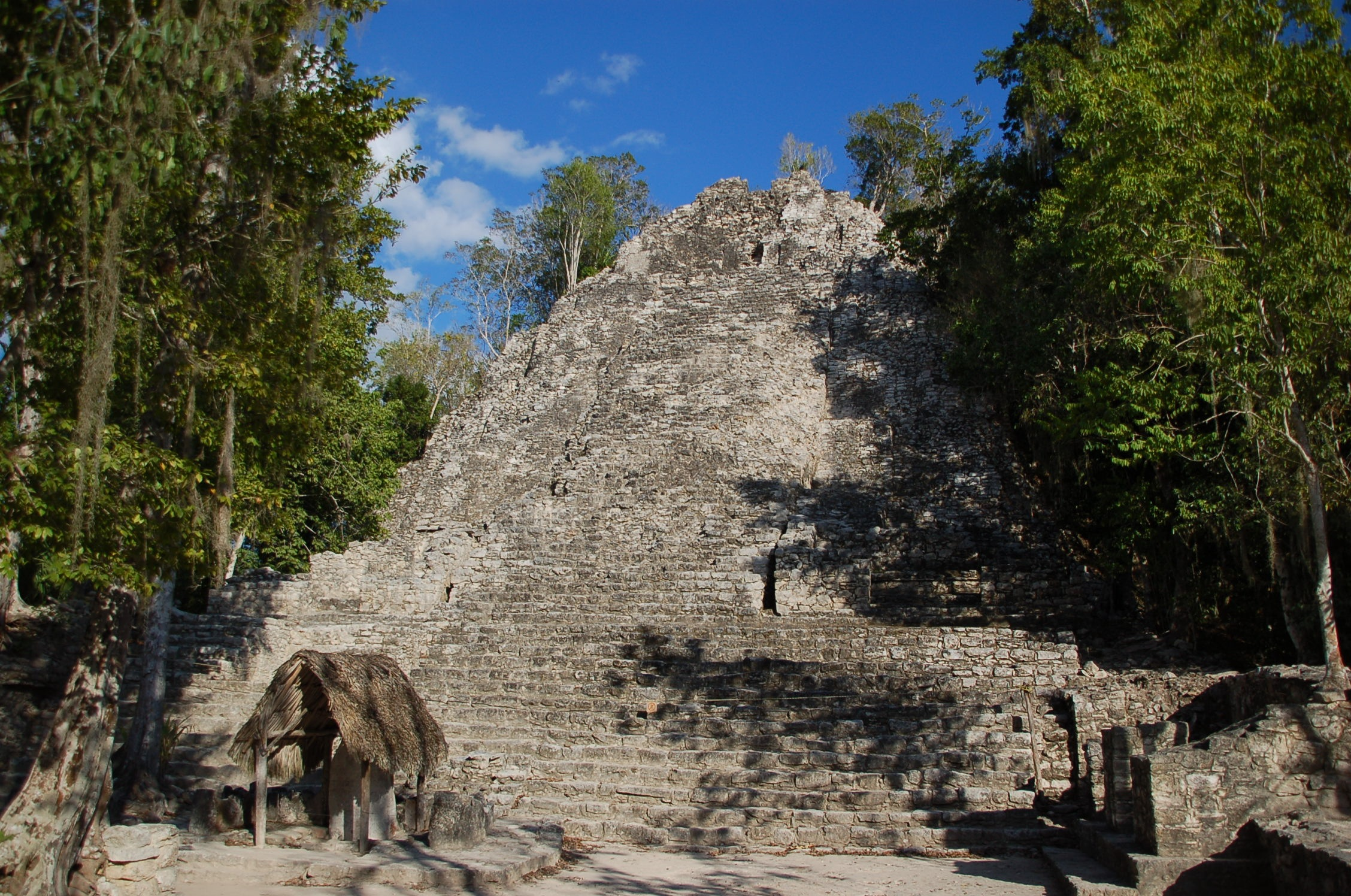
Front view of the pyramid structure known as "La Iglesia" in the Group B, or Cobá Group, complex. Stela 11 is in the foreground at the base of the pyramid's steps, under the thatched roofing.

The first mention of Coba in print is due to John Lloyd Stephens where he mentioned hearing reports of the site in 1842 from the cura (priest or vicar in Spanish) of Chemax, but it was so distant from any known modern road or village that he decided the difficulty in trying to get there was too daunting and returned to his principal target of exploring Tulum instead. For much of the rest of the 19th century the area could not be visited by outsiders due to the Caste War of Yucatán, the notable exception was Juan Peón Contreras (also used the nom de plume Contreras Elizalde) who was then director of the Museum of Yucatán. He made the arduous journey in September 1882, and is now remembered for the four naive pen-and-ink sketches that he made at the ruins (prints made from them exist in the Peabody Museum and in the collection of Raúl Pavón Abreu in Campeche). Teoberto Maler paid Coba a short visit in 1893 and took at least one photograph, but did not publish at the time and the site remained unknown to the archeological community.

Amateur explorer (and successful writer of popular books wherein he described his adventures and discoveries among Maya ruins) Dr. Thomas Gann was brought to the site by some local Maya hunters in February 1926. Gann published the first first-hand description of the ruins later the same year. Gann gave a short description to the archeologists of the Carnegie Institution of Washington (CIW) project at Chichen Itza, he spoke of the large mounds he had sighted, but not visited for lack of time, lying to the northeast of the main group. It was to examine these that Alfred Kidder and J. Eric S. Thompson went for a two-day inspection of the site in March. Two months later Thompson was again at Coba, forming with Jean Charlot the third CIW expedition. On this trip their guide, Carmen Chai, showed them the "Macanxoc Group", a discovery that led to the departure of a fourth expedition, since Sylvanus Morley wanted Thompson to show him the new stelae. Eric Thompson made a number of return visits to the site through 1932, the same year he published a detailed description.

In 1932, H. B. Roberts opened a number of trenches in Group B to collect sherds.

In 1948, two graduate students in archaeology, William and Michael Coe, visited Coba, intent on seeking the terminus of Sacbe 15. They were unaware that E. Wyllys Andrews IV already reported it ten years prior. In an editor's note following their report, Thompson blames himself as editor for failing to detect the repetition of prior work in their contribution, while excusing the young authors for ignorance of a paper published in a foreign journal. But the Coes reported the previously unknown Sacbes 18 and 19 and mapped the large mound at the terminus of Sacbe 17, which they named Pech Mul (they were unlucky again in failing to complete their circuit of its platform, or they might have discovered the sacbe leading out of it, no. 21).

The site remained little visited due to its remoteness until the first modern road was opened up to Coba in the early 1970s. As a major resort was planned for Cancún, it was realized that clearing and restoring some of the large site could make it an important tourist attraction. The Mexican National Institute of Anthropology & History (INAH) began some archeological excavations in 1972 directed by Carlos Navarrete, and consolidated a couple of buildings. Expectations of new discoveries were borne out when El Cono (Structure D-6) and Grupo Las Pinturas came to light, among other features. In the same year, much of Grupo Coba was cleared on the instructions of Raúl Pavón Abreu; not even its tall ramón trees were spared.

In 1975, a branch road from the asphalted highway being built from Tulum to Nuevo X-Can reached Coba (the road engineers heeded objections by archaeologists and abandoned their original plan of incorporating Sacbe 3 in the roadbed). A project camp was built in 1973, and in 1974 the Project Coba proper, under the auspices of the Regional Center of the Southeast of INAH was able to begin its operations. During the three-year existence of the project, portions of the site were cleared and structures excavated and consolidated, (the Castillo and the Pinturas Group by Peniche; the Iglesia by Benavides and Jaime Garduño; El Cono by Benavides and Fernando Robles); the sacbes were investigated by Folan and by Benavides, who added 26 to the list of 19 previously known; the ceramics from test pits and trenches were studied by Robles; and Jaime Garduño surveyed two transects of the site, one of 10 km north–south and another of 5 km east–west.

At the start of the 1980s, another road to Coba was opened up and paved, and a regular bus service begun. Coba became a tourist destination shortly thereafter, with many visitors flocking to the site on day trips from Cancún and the Riviera Maya. Only a small portion of the site has been cleared from the jungle and restored by archaeologists.

As of 2005, the resident population of Coba pueblo was 1,167. It grew to 1,278 by the 2010 census.

== Mythology: The Descending (or Diving God) ==
At the top of the Ixmoja pyramid (also known as Nohoch Mul) is a rectangular structure with carvings of the Descending (or Diving) God. This upside-down figure is portrayed with wings, looking like a diving bird only with a human form, and is often holding onto something. It is typically associated with the Bee God, whose official name is Ah Muzen Cab or Ah Muu Zen Caab.

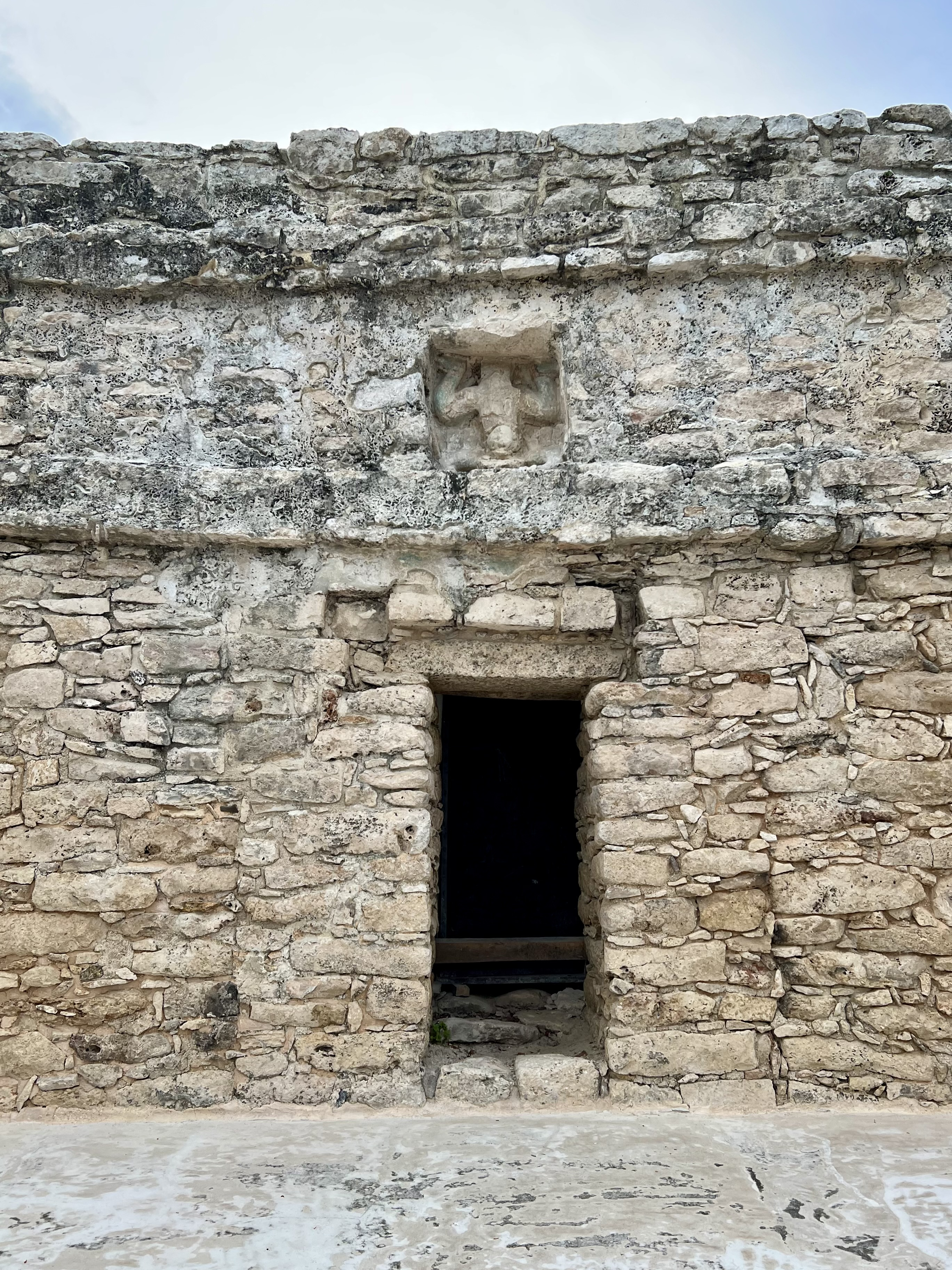
Descending (or Diving) God carving at the top of Ixmoja pyramid in Cobá

It is not fully understood why the Descending (or Diving) god is carved here, but this same god is carved at other sites on the Yucatán Peninsula, including Tulum and Sayil, along with references to it at Chichen Itzá. Debra Sandidge lists further details on locations in regards to these correlations in her article, "The Descending God".

Bees played an important part in Maya ceremonies, daily life, and trade, especially the stingless types located in the area (see Melipona Beechaeii and Melipona Yucatanica). Tulum was a major port for many large city-states in the Maya world, including Cobá, which acted as a religious center for much of the area. However, Cobá also traded with other large city-states, including Calakmul and sites in Belize to the south, along with Chichen Itzá in later years.

Honey was used not only as a sweetener, but also as a main ingredient in the ceremonial drink, balché, which was similar to mead. In addition, honey was used as an antibiotic and a mortar component. The bee's wax was also an important commodity for the Maya people, who used the wax for metal casts, as a sealant, and for candle making.

The Descending (Diving) God has also been linked to Venus, the planet, in relation to politics within the Maya society. Venus played a very important role in Maya astronomy and mythology, including being used by Maya leaders and shamans to determine the best time for battles and wars. As Cobá's influence in the Maya world waned, there was more fighting between other surrounding city-states for control of the region for trade, economic, and political reasons. These carvings of the Descending (Diving) God may also have to do with this shift in political power.

Even though the Descending (Diving) God is not fully understood yet, it being present in Cobá and the other city-states in the area most likely show the importance of bees/honey and the planet Venus in trade, economic development, religion, and war-related politics.

== Economy ==
In the past, the people of Coba had traded extensively with other Mayan communities, particularly the ones further south along the Caribbean coast in what is now Belize and Honduras. It utilized the ports of Xcaret, Xel-Há, Tankah, Muyil, and Tulum as well as the many sacbeob that sprout from this cultural center. Typical items of trade of the Maya of this area were: salt, fish, squash, yams, corn, honey, beans, turkey, vegetables, chocolate drinks and raw materials such as limestone, marble, and jade. There was specialization in different areas on the site which were because of who was living and working where and what their trade was. Almost all of the commerce was controlled by wealthy merchants. These merchants used cacao beans for currency. Today's economy is based on the rising popularity of tourism to the archaeological site.

== Tourism ==
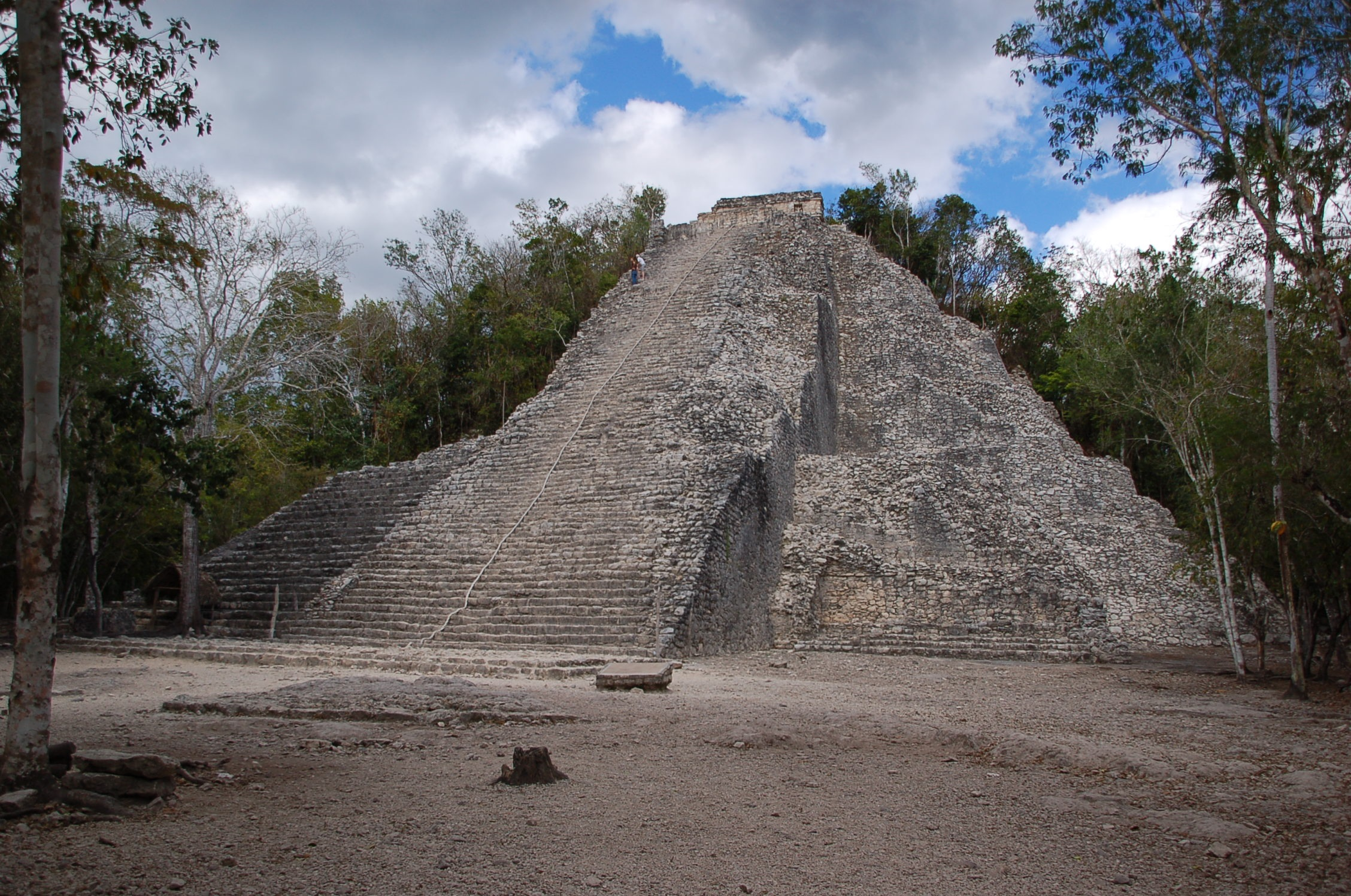
Nohoch Mul Pyramid, Cobá

Cobá video

The archaeological site of Coba received 702,749 visitors in 2017. One of Coba's main attractions is the Ancient Pyramid which, unlike Chichen Itza's Kukulkan Pyramid, is still open for the public to climb its 130 steps up to the top of the site (prior to being closed due to the COVID-19 pandemic).

There are also three hotels, one campsite and seven restaurants scattered throughout the site and there is a small pueblo near the ruins, with some restaurants and small shops selling local crafts.

The following are the important artifacts and structures that can be viewed and experienced within the ruins of Coba:

- Nohoch Mul Pyramid – A 42-meter tall (137-foot) pyramid that boasts a remarkable view of the Yucatán and non-public areas of Coba including both lagoons; Macanxoc Lagoon to the east and Cobá Lagoon to the southwest. Climbing the pyramid was prohibited for several years, but was reinstated late 2025 with the introduction of a wooden staircase leading to the top.
- Coba Group – This is a series of structures close to the entrance that include the Iglesia and one of two ball courts located in this site.
- Conjunto de Pinturas – The focus of this area is the Pyramid of the Painted Lintel where visitors can see from afar actual paintings on the top temple.
- Macanxoc Group – Past the Conjunto de Pinturas is the Macanxoc Group that is found following one of the sacbes. This area has 8 stelae and numerous altars. The vast number of stelae show that this area was of spiritual significance to later occupants.
- Coba Stelae – These monuments give insight into various aspects of the formal life of Cobá, including dress, ritual processes, and the roles and power of both men and women in the city's ceremonial and political activities. Women are the figures of authority in many of the scenes depicted on the stelae. The hieroglyphic inscriptions contain additional information about the city's sociopolitical organization as well as dates and accounts of major historical events.
- Sacbe – Cobá was an urban hub of many settlements that were joined by roads called sacbes. These roads range in width from 2 to 10 meters. The longest is almost 100 km, and connects Cobá to the site of Yaxuná to the west. Such construction is believed to be more difficult than that invested into stone buildings and temples. Engineered with sloped surfaces and lime-plaster (saskab) finishing, these elevated causeways also incorporated subterranean drainage channels to manage seasonal stormwater runoff across the karstic terrain.

== Climate ==
Considered a tropical savanna climate typically with a pronounced dry season. The Köppen Climate Classification subtype for this climate is Aw (Tropical Savanna Climate).

Climate data for Coba, Mexico
Month	Jan	Feb	Mar	Apr	May	Jun	Jul	Aug	Sep	Oct	Nov	Dec	Year
Mean daily maximum °C (°F)	27 (80)	28 (82)	29 (84)	31 (87)	32 (89)	32 (90)	32 (90)	32 (90)	31 (88)	29 (85)	29 (84)	27 (81)	30 (86)
Mean daily minimum °C (°F)	14 (58)	15 (59)	16 (61)	18 (65)	20 (68)	21 (70)	21 (70)	22 (71)	21 (70)	20 (68)	17 (63)	16 (60)	18 (65)
Average precipitation mm (inches)	53 (2.1)	38 (1.5)	41 (1.6)	46 (1.8)	100 (4.1)	140 (5.5)	100 (4.1)	150 (6)	200 (7.7)	140 (5.4)	66 (2.6)	38 (1.5)	1,100 (44)
Source: Weatherbase

== Image gallery ==
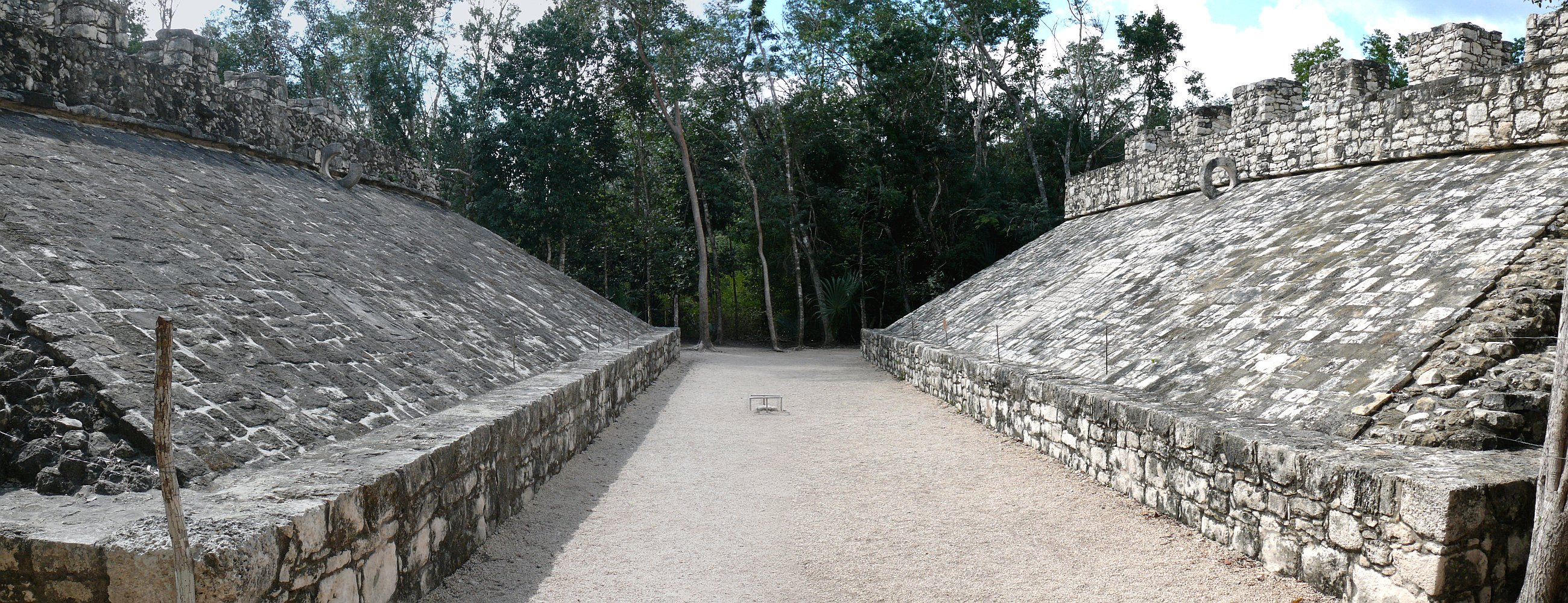
One of two ballgame courts at Cobá, in the Navarette Group

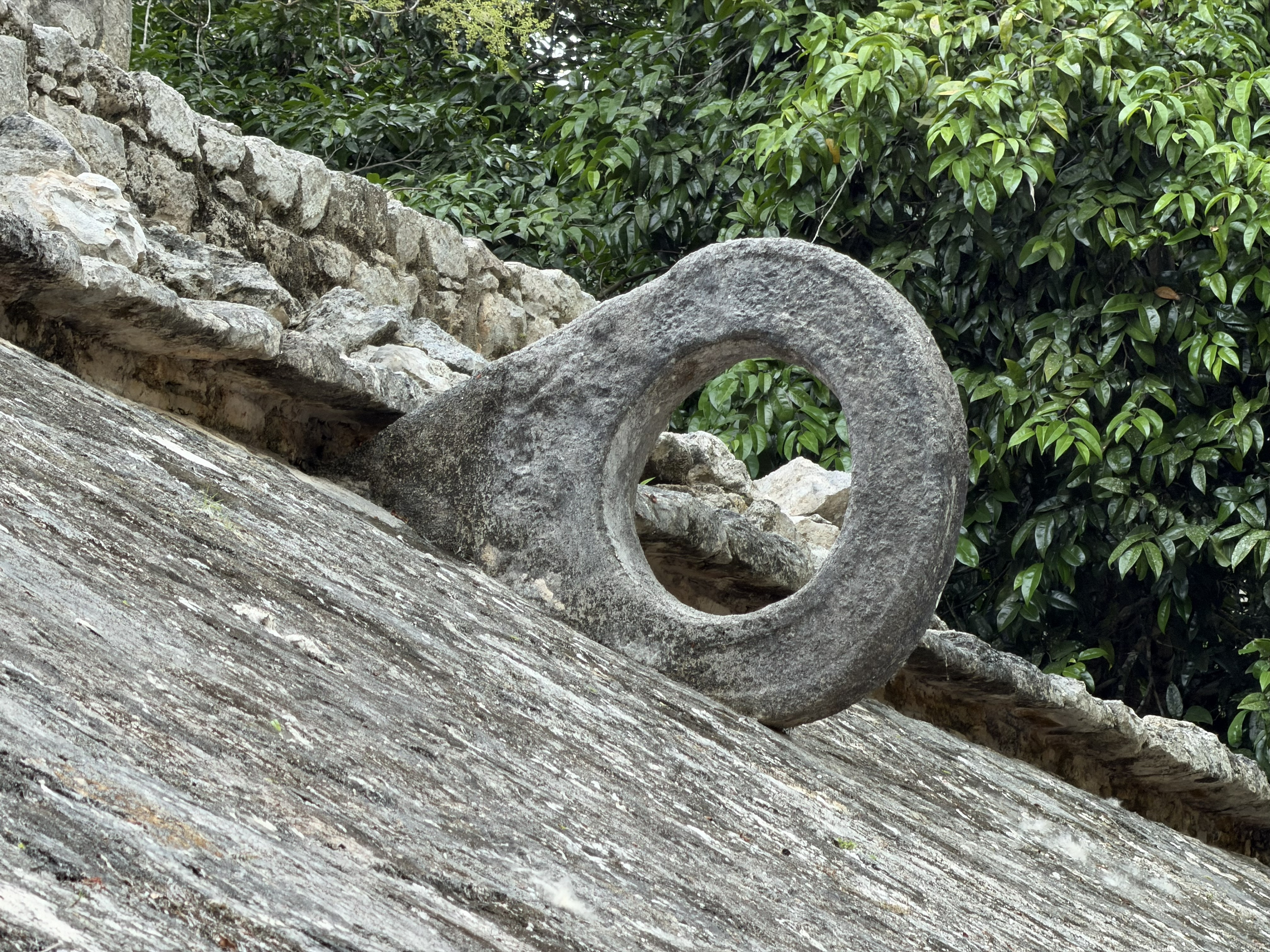
Coba group ball court stone ring 1

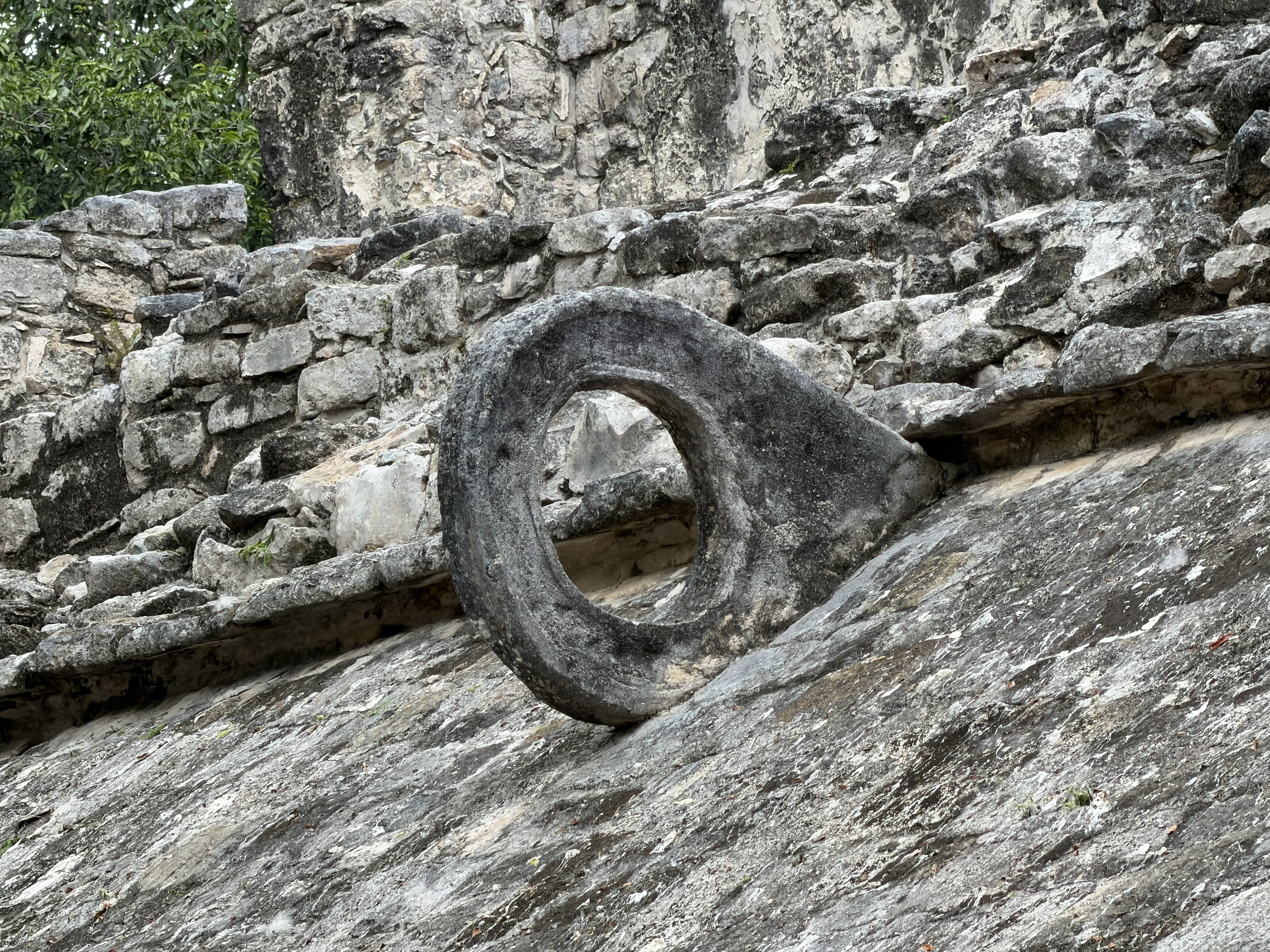
Coba group ball court stone ring 2

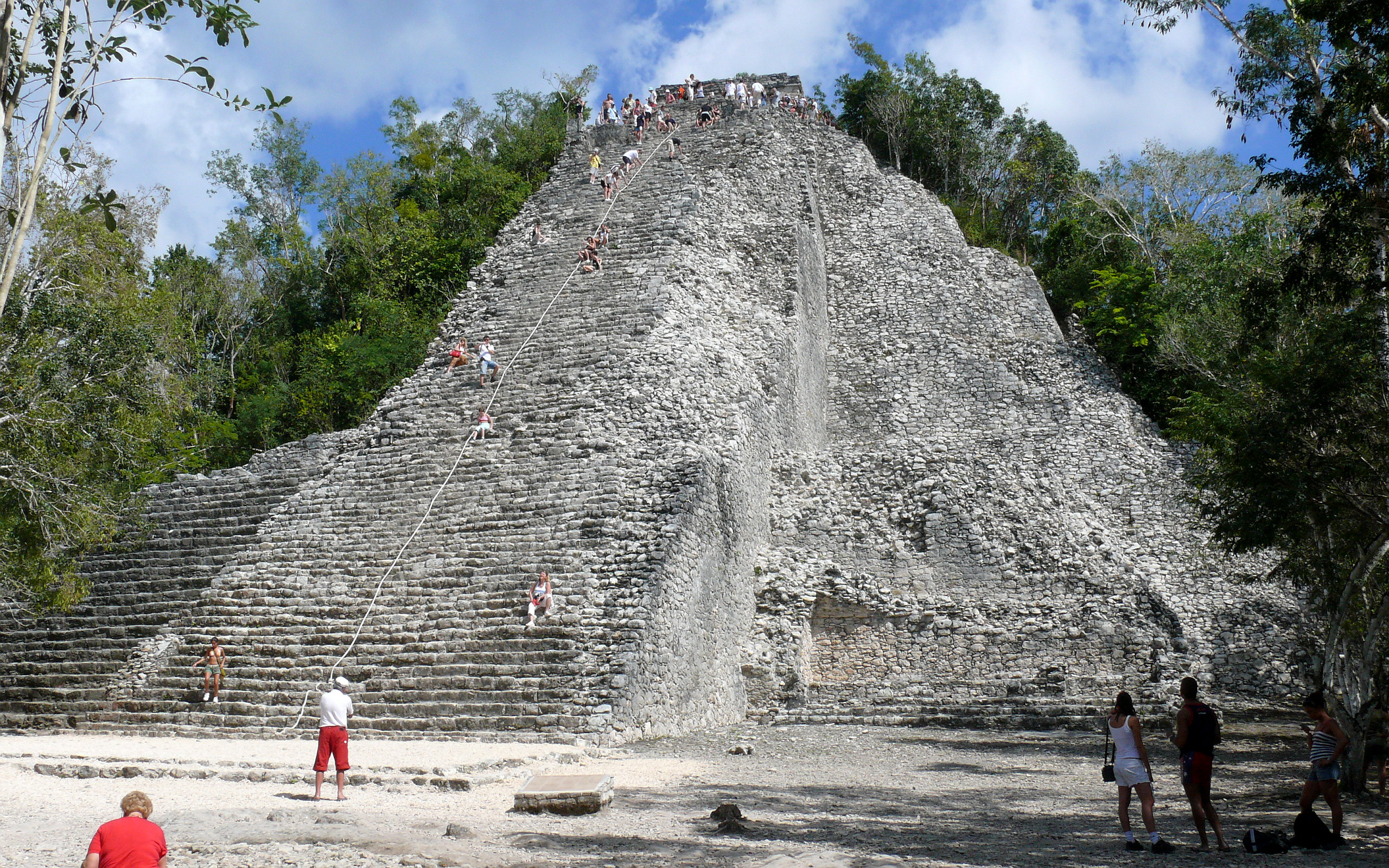
The Ixmoja pyramid

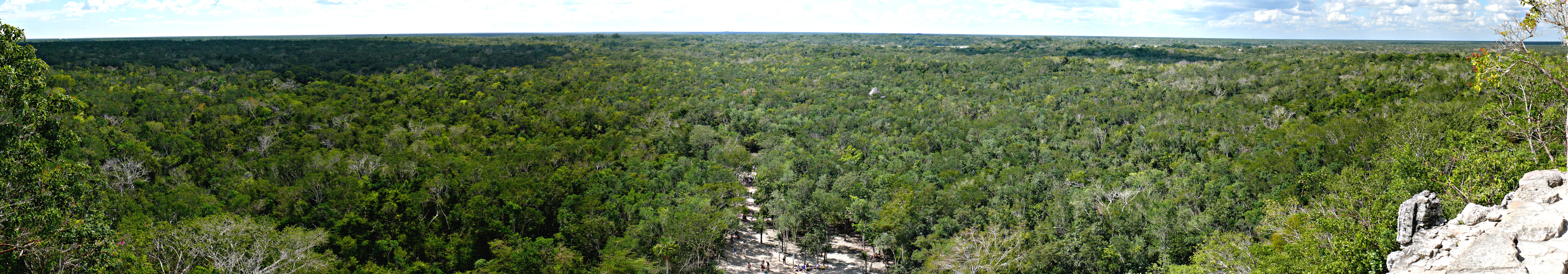
Panoramic view from the top of the Ixmoja pyramid
