= Cobas =

Cobas may refer to:

- Antonio Cobas (1952–2004), Spanish motorcycle designer, constructor and mechanic
- Yariulvis Cobas (born 1990), Cuban rower
- Cobas 4800, test for human papillomavirus
- Cyphostemma juttae, an ornamental plant also known as bastard cobas

The acronym COBAS can refer to:

- Communauté d'agglomération du Bassin d'Arcachon Sud, a metropolitan area in France along Arcachon Bay
- Confederazione dei Comitati di Base

== See also ==
- Coba (disambiguation)
