= Nohoch Mul =

Coordinates: 20.4947°N 87.7202°W

- Ixmoja
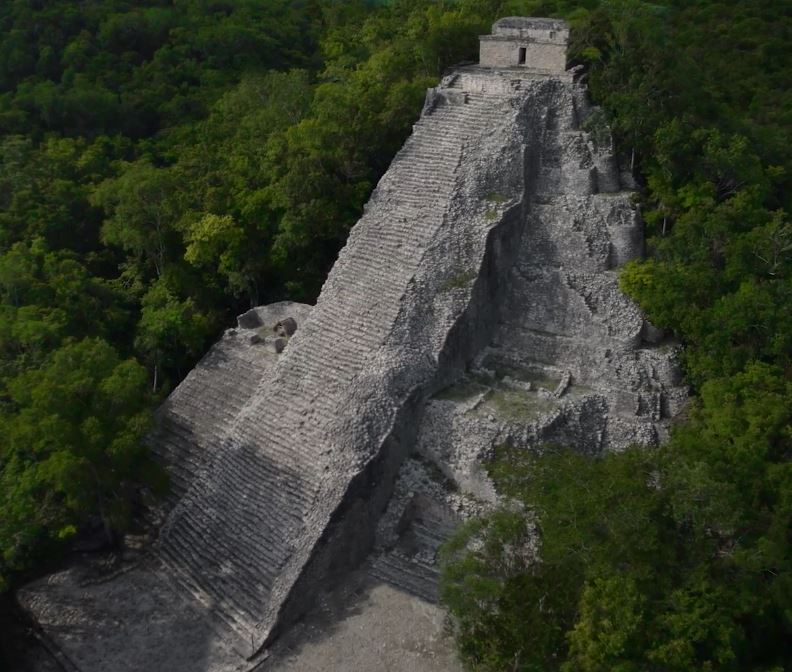

- Location within Mexico
- Type: Maya pyramid
- Location: Coba, Mexico

History
- Built: 6th–12th century

Site notes
- Height: 42 metres (138 ft)

Nohoch Mul or Ixmoja is a Maya pyramid located in the ancient pre-Columbian city of Coba in the state of Quintana Roo, Mexico with a height of 42 meters (138 ft) considered the tallest Maya structure and pyramid in the north of the Yucatán Peninsula, it consists of a large stepped base topped by a temple at the top. It was built in the Classic period of the Maya civilization and was occupied until the post-classic period.

The Nohoch Mul pyramid is the main structure of Coba and is located in the architectural complex known as group A (or also called Nohoch Mul group in reference to the main pyramid), which contains the largest buildings in the city. The name Nohoch Mul comes from the Maya language (Nojoch Muul) and means "great mound" in reference to the dimensions of the structure.

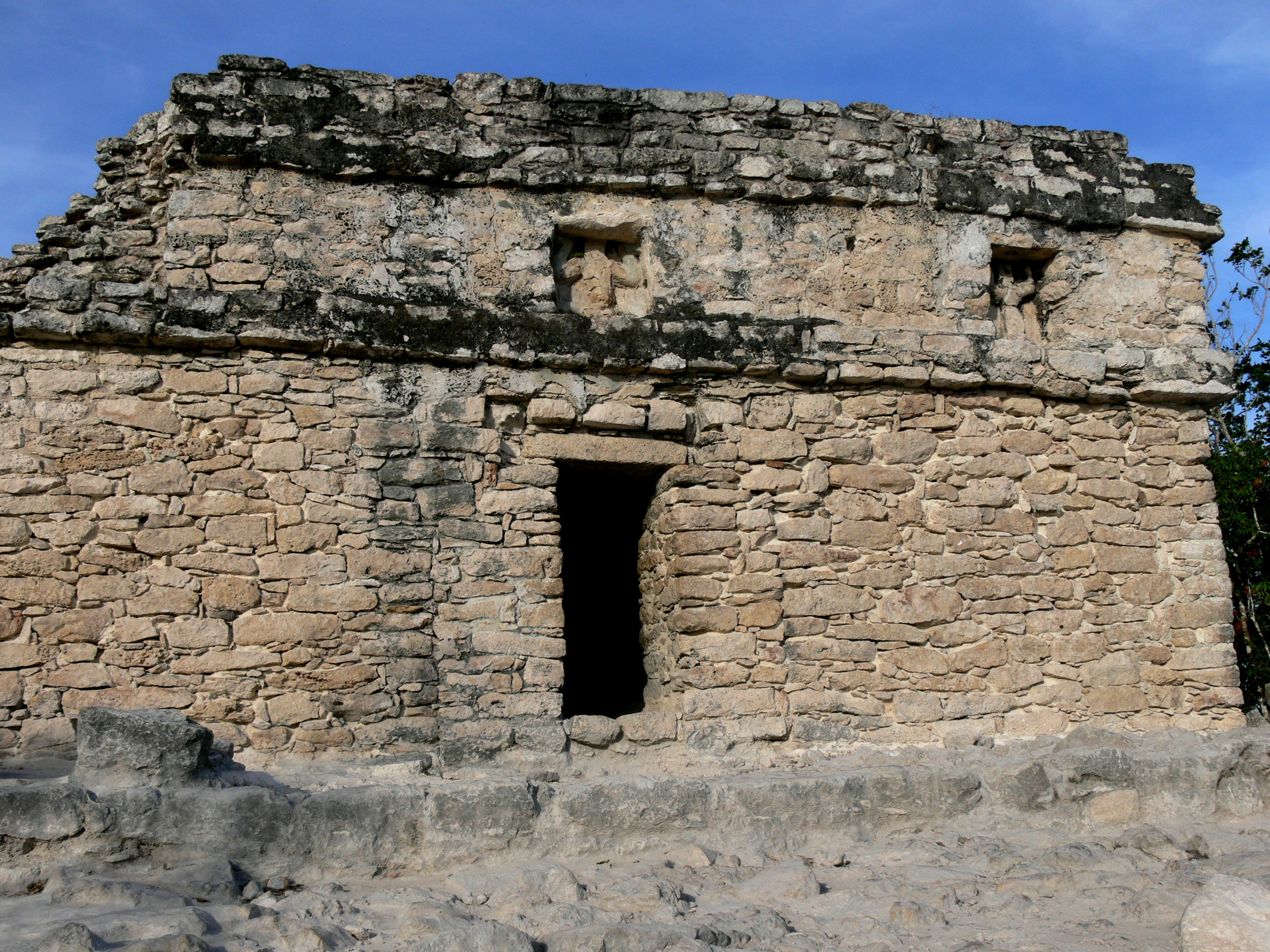
Temple at the top of the pyramid

== History ==
The Nohoch Mul pyramid dates to the classic period of the Maya civilization and was built during the great urban development that the city of Coba had during its peak and development as a political center. A large limestone hieroglyphic stela found near the pyramid contains an extensive inscription recording the long count date of 9.6.15.6.9. 13 Muluk 12 Sip which corresponds to May 12, 569 AD as the founding of a site called Keh Witz Nal that could be the original name of the area where the group A complex of Coba was built or one of its structures like the Nohoch Mul pyramid. During the post-classical period, the main buildings of Coba were remodeled implementing new regional architectural elements. The temple on the top of the Nohoch Mul pyramid was built following the architecture of the East Coast of Quintana Roo.

== Architecture ==
The structure of the Nohoch Mul pyramid is a monumental pyramidal base with 7 levels and rounded edges with a central staircase of 120 steps leading to the temple at the top of the pyramid and a staircase on the side leading to a lower platform.
