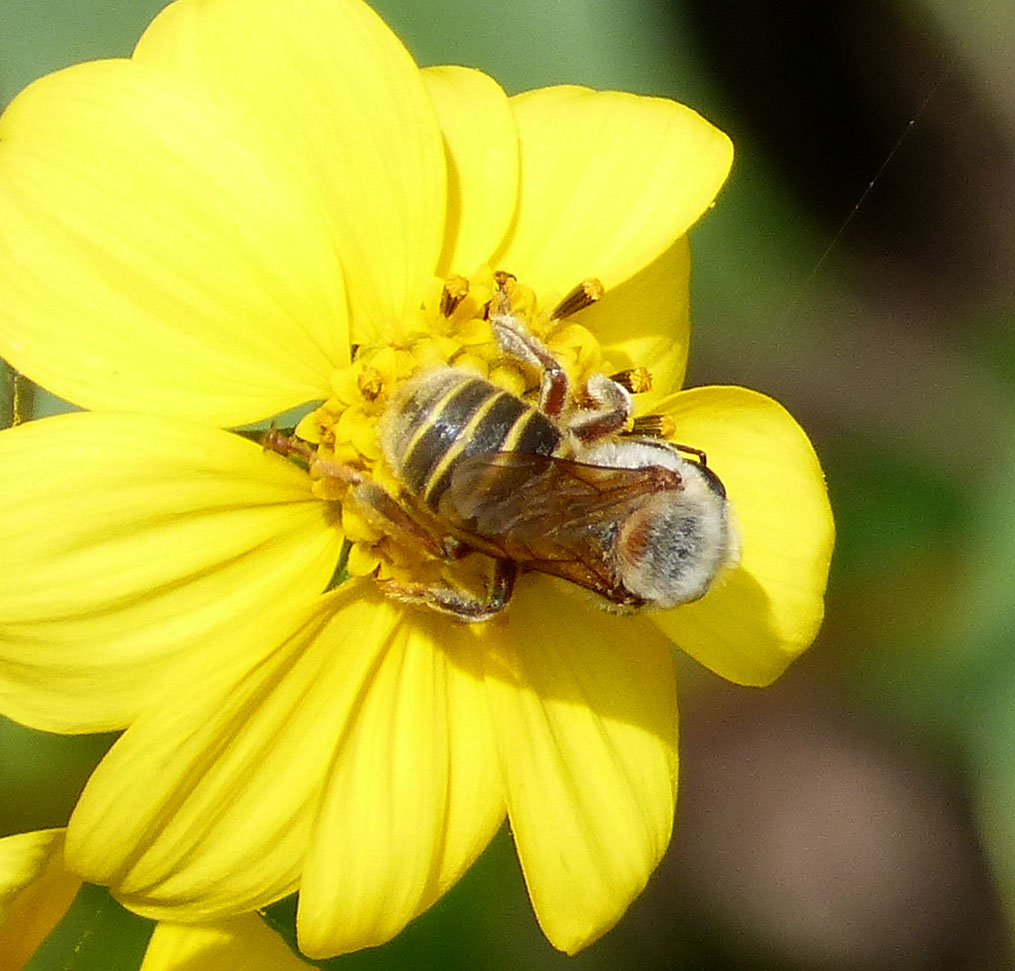

Scientific classification
- Kingdom: Animalia
- Phylum: Arthropoda
- Clade: Pancrustacea
- Class: Insecta
- Order: Hymenoptera
- Family: Apidae
- Genus: Melipona
- Species: M. beecheii

Binomial name
- Melipona beecheii Bennett, 1831

= Melipona beecheii =

Species of bee

Melipona beecheii is a species of eusocial stingless bee. It is native to Central America from the Yucatán Peninsula in the north to Costa Rica in the south. M. beecheii was cultivated in the Yucatán Peninsula starting in the pre-Columbian era by the ancient Maya civilization. The Mayan name for M. beecheii is xunan kab, which translates roughly to "regal lady bee". M. beecheii serves as the subject of various Mayan religious ceremonies. Queens usually have a longer and more slender body compared to other species of bees.

== Taxonomy and phylogeny ==
Melipona beecheii is a member of the family Apidae of eusocial bees within the order Hymenoptera. The subfamily Meliponini is commonly referred to as "stingless bees". The genus Melipona contains nearly 50 other species.

== Description and identification ==
Melipona beecheii has a golden-yellowish and brown striped body with translucent wings. M. beecheii has small, white hairs covering the head, thorax, and abdomen.

Queens, workers, and drones are all roughly the same size. Moreover, all members of the hive regardless of their future role develop in identical, mass-provisioned, sealed cells. This allows for self-determination of roles, the root of caste conflict within M. beecheii.

== Distribution and habitat ==
Melipona beecheii is a tropical eusocial bee that has been observed in a variety of geographic locations with tropical climates. M. beecheii can be found in Central America, especially in the southern Yucatán Peninsula of Mexico, Guatemala, El Salvador, Nicaragua, and Costa Rica.

=== Conservation status ===
This bee has been observed primarily in tropical forests, both humid and arid. M. beecheii builds its nests inside hollow cavities of trees, and as a result, has been seriously affected by deforestation. Moreover, use of insecticides in the forest is increasing and interest in the ancient Mayan practice of beekeeping is decreasing. Beekeepers who work with M. beecheii in the Mayan zone in Quintana Roo state, Mexico, have reported a 93% decrease in hives over the past 25 years.

== Colony cycle ==
In M. beecheii, all females, even those designated to be workers, have the ability to develop as queens. As a result of this potential to self-determine, immature females may try to develop as queens to gain greater reproductive opportunities. When a colony's queen dies, or before the formation of new colonies by swarming, new queens are produced, only one of which is selected to serve in that function per colony. Workers kill the extra queens by biting off their heads, abdomens, and limbs. The average life expectancy of developing queens is 47 hours.

Advantages to producing excess queens include the provision of spare queens in case of queen failure, and the ability to select the best queen from a pool of candidates.

== Behavior ==
=== Division of labor ===
Melipona beecheii exhibits foraging specialization within the community. Single-foraging bees are responsible for harvesting one single commodity, such as pollen, nectar, or resin, in a single day while multiforaging bees forage for two or three of those resources. About half of the bees are single-foraging and half are multiforaging. A switch in foraging specialization occurs very rapidly, often within a single day.

No one style was found to be advantageous over the other in terms of feeding and resource-acquisition opportunities. However, activity patterns and longevity differed significantly between groups. Individuals responsible for foraging nectar were observed to be active all day and died, on average, after three full days of foraging. However, pollen foragers were only observed to be active for about 1–3 hours per day and lived for an average of 12 days. In spite of this contrast, both styles of foraging resulted in an equal number of flights in a lifetime. The way in which individual M. beecheii organisms' foraging style is designated within the community is still unknown.

=== Caste determination ===
Caste determination in Hymenoptera is either trophogenic or genetic. In trophogenic caste determination, an organism's caste is dictated by the quality and quantity of food it received during development. In genetic caste determination, an organism's caste is inherent in its genetics. Trophogenic caste determination is much more common; genetic caste determination is quite rare. While there is some evidence for a nutritional influence on caste determination in Melipona, in M. beecheii queens and workers have similar weights, supporting self-determination of caste.

== Reproduction ==
Similar to most beehives, an M. beecheii colony has one fertile queen and numerous nonreproductive female worker bees. The queen that is fertile and lays eggs is known as the physogastric queen. However, in M. beecheii excess queens are produced, most of which are destined to remain virgins. These excess queens are almost always killed by workers before they are able to lay eggs.

=== Pre-discharge phase ===
The physogastric queen's reproduction is dependent on the workers. The workers arrange the cells prior to the queen's arrival. When the queen arrives at a cell, the pre-discharge phase begins with a worker inserting themselves into a cell.

=== Discharge phase ===
The queen then performs oviposition, the process of depositing eggs into a cell. The queen taps the worker with her antennae and forelegs. This contact serves to signal the worker to insert larval food into the cell.

Afterwards, the queen checks the cell and eats the trophic egg, an unfertilized egg that is made specifically for the queen's nutrition.

=== Abiotic factors ===
Melipona beecheii reproduction depends on many abiotic factors, including the time of year, climate, and resources available. Extreme reproduction was observed at the end of the rainy season wherein an excess of resources were able to be stored. In contrast, due to poor resource obtainment, M. beecheii populations decreased when there were good foraging conditions and food storage had built up. When foraging conditions are good, less energy is expended on reproduction.

== Interaction with other species ==
=== Diet ===
Melipona beecheii, like most other bee species, consumes nectar and pollen. M. beecheii exhibits foraging specialization within the community.

=== Predators ===
The typical predators of M. beecheii are many different species of birds, spiders, lizards, and other bugs. M. beecheii is an easier target because it is unable to sting as a form of defense.

=== Parasites ===
Melipona beecheii is parasitized primarily by the parasitic phorid fly, Pseudohypocera kerteszi. Other than this organism, there are not many parasites or disease-causing organisms that affect M. beecheii. In general, American foulbrood, which is caused by Paenibacillus larvae, is a harmful disease for all honey-producing bees, but there is not much data regarding its specific effect on M. beecheii.

=== Mutualism ===
Melipona beecheii often has mutualisms with flowering plants. M. beecheii pollinates the flowers by carrying both nectar and pollen between plants, allowing them to collect food for themselves and their colony in the process. While it is not yet clear which specific flowering plants M. beecheii forms mutualistic relationships with, the patterns and habits have been studied so a mutualistic relationship has been confirmed.

=== Competitors ===
Melipona beecheii's main competitors are other pollinating insects. For M. beecheii in its tropical environment, its other pollinating, stingless bee competitors include Melipona fasciata and other nests of M. beecheii.

=== Defense ===
Though M. beecheii is a stingless bee, it has the ability to bite other organisms when it feels threatened or is under attack. When in a communal setting, M. beecheii coordinates attack signals via secretions from their mandibular glands. The main pheromone involved in eliciting a communal attack response in M. beecheii is farnesyl acetate. When secreted, all individuals in the nest are stimulated to attack. An additional strategy that M. beecheii uses to protect itself from predation is remaining inside its nest. Because M. beecheii primarily builds its nest inside trees, remaining inside the nest proves to be a rather sturdy and safe environment to protect each individual organism from predation.

== Human importance ==
Beekeepers in the Yucatán peninsula have harvested honey from the nests of M. beecheii until Africanized bees arrived. As a result, M. beecheii is facing loss of habitat and the ancient tradition of stingless beekeeping is on the verge of dying out.

=== Agriculture ===
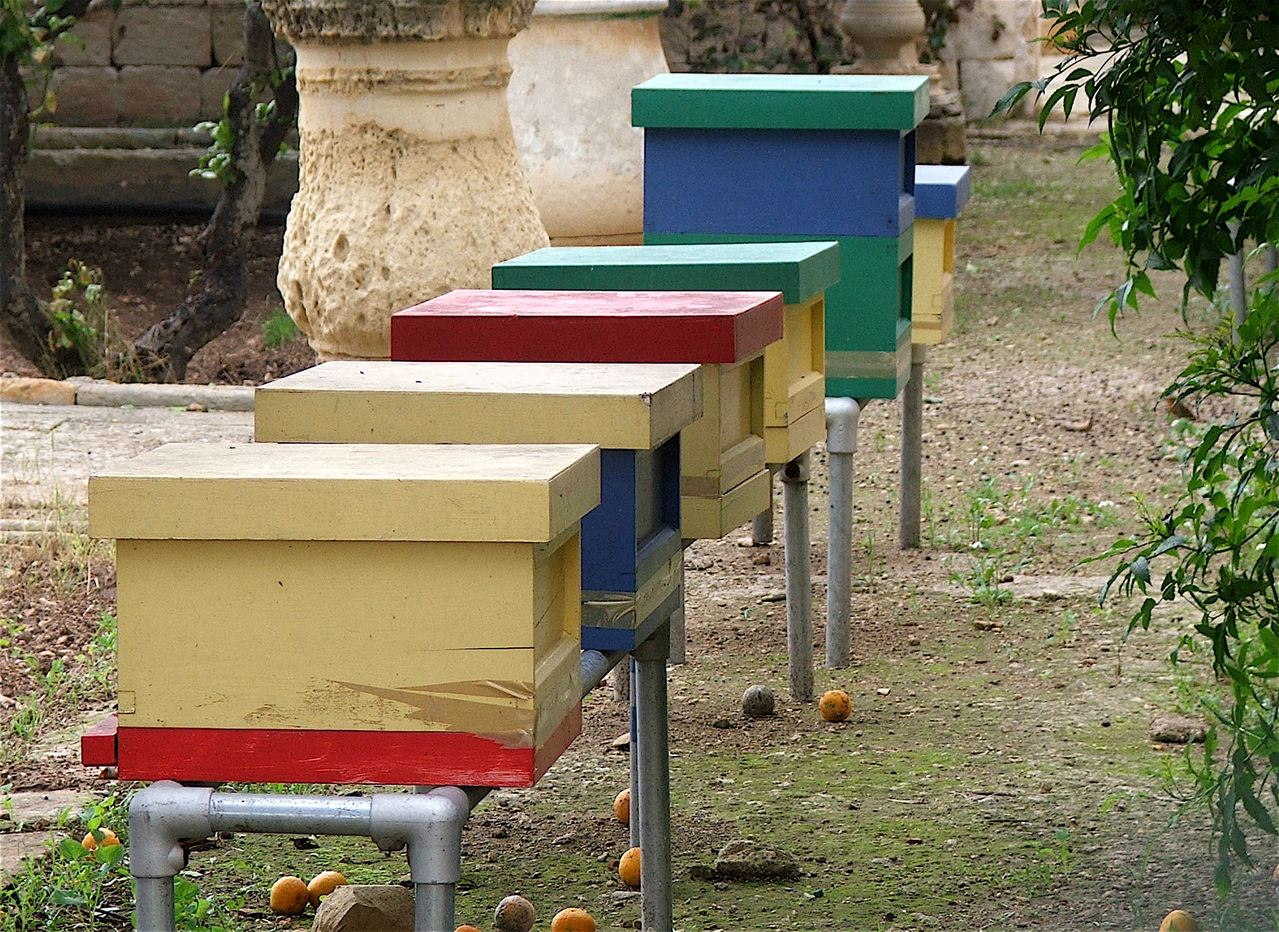
Stingless beekeeping farm.

Because M. beecheii is a stingless bee and eats nectar, its ecological niche does not involve hunting pest insects. However, M. beecheii plays an extremely important role in honey production, as they have been kept for centuries almost exclusively in log nests primarily by people who live in the Yucatán Peninsula of Mexico. M. beecheii is an important source of honey both in the region and around the world. Due to the concern that stingless bee keeping is going extinct, the possibility of negative effects resulting from the impact of competition from feral African Apis mellifera, over-harvesting, failure to transfer colonies to hives or divide them, deforestation, hurricane damage and lack of instruction and incentive for new stingless bee keepers has been postulated and explored.

=== Stings ===
Melipona beecheii is a stingless bee and, as a result, cannot sting humans or other organisms. This characteristic makes them ideal for beekeeping. That being said, when agitated, M. beecheii does have the capacity to bite other organisms. However, there is no medical hazard or allergy factor involved.

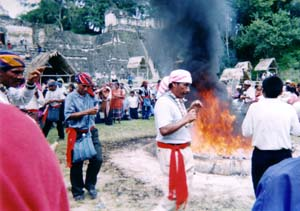
Mayan religious ceremony.

=== History and art ===
In accordance with Mayan history, M. beecheii are the embodiment of a link to the spirit world, an endowment of the god Ah Muzen Cab. M. beecheii serves as the subject of various Mayan religious ceremonies. M. beecheii has been greatly revered by Mayan culture throughout history, leading to its keeping by the Mayan people as a means of attaining a higher-being, one which is closer to God. According to the Maya tradition, a priest would harvest M. beecheii honey during a religious ceremony that would take place twice a year. As a means of increasing the number of nests and honey production, beekeepers would regularly divide existing nests. This would also help to alleviate the predicament of excess queens that occurs with M. beecheii.
