= Coba Lake =

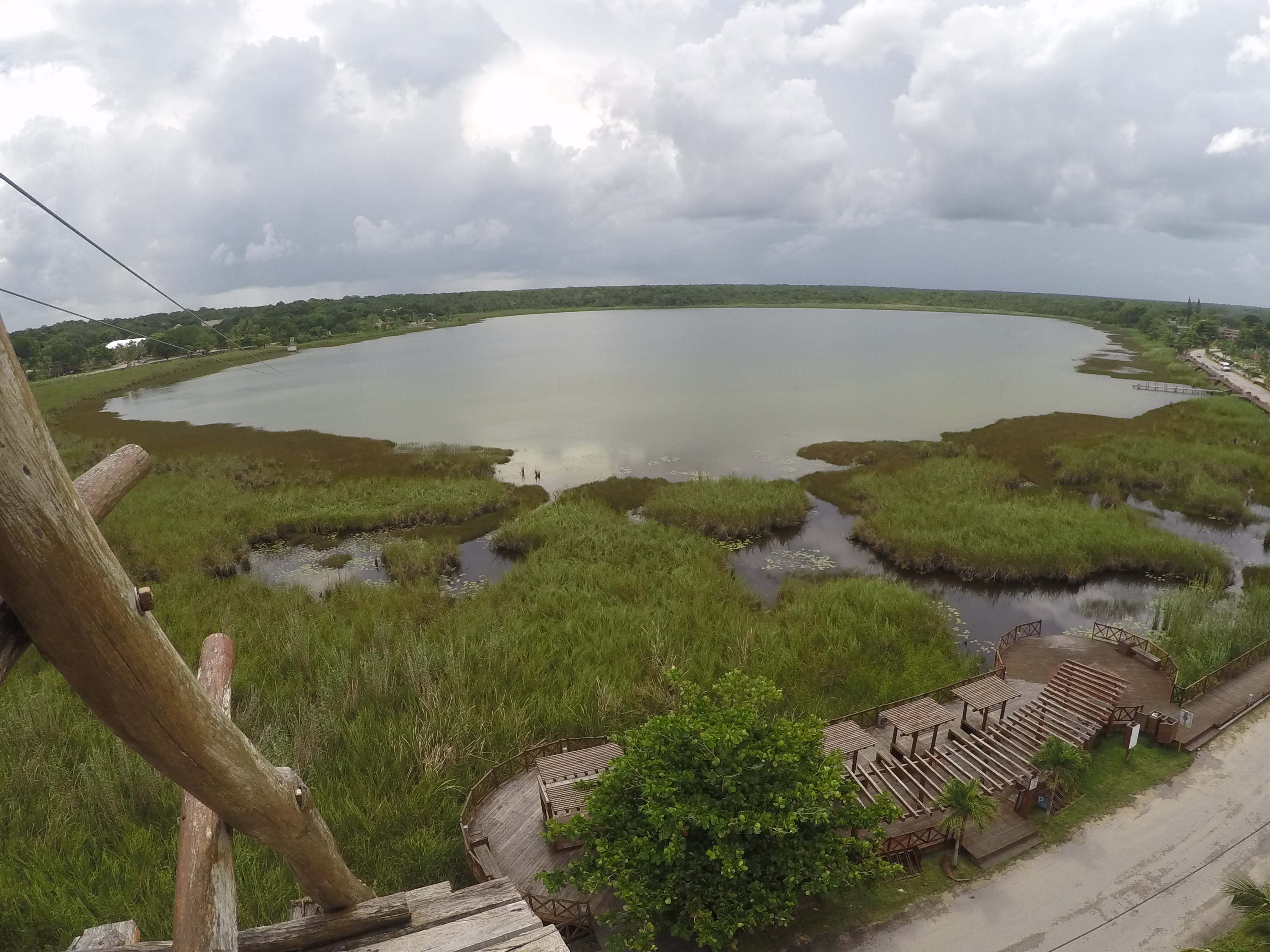
- View over the lake from zip line tower

- Location within Yucatán (state)
- Location: Quintana Roo
- Coordinates: 20.491939°N 87.738233°W
- Type: Natural lake
- Primary inflows: (subterranean)
- Primary outflows: (subterranean)
- Basin countries: Mexico
- Max. length: 0.6 km (0.37 mi)
- Islands: 0
- Settlements: Coba

The Coba Lake or Lake Coba (Spanish Lago Cobá) is an almost circular lake close to the ancient Maya city of Coba on the Yucatán peninsula.

The lake is surrounded by a reed zone that hosts crocodiles. There is a zip line installation that crosses part of the lake.

A lake of similar size and shape, Lake Makanxoc, lies close to the east.
