= College of Business Administration =

College of Business Administration may refer to:

- a college or school of business [administration] at a university or college
- College of Business Administration (Saudi Arabia)
