= Selim Çoba =

Albanian religious scholar

Selim Efendi Çoba (? in Shkodër – 1900) was a müderris who headed the Shkodër branch of the League of Prizren.

== Biography ==
Very little is known about his life. He was among his city's delegation to the League of Prizren in 1878. In a telegram sent to Benjamin Disraeli on June 15 of that year, Çoba's signature followed the first one from Daut Boriçi. In October, Çoba was one of two delegates appointed to the Shkodër branch of the General Council in Prizren. A year later, on the eve of delegations from Hot and Grudë leaving the league, Çoba reaffirmed the Shkodër district's commitment.

According to oral tradition, Çoba was arrested with other members of the Shkodër chapter after the Battle of Ulcinj.

For a time he served as the mayor of Shkodër, and he was a judge on the court of civil and criminal appeals from 1894 to 1897.
