= Coba Höyük =

Archaeological site in Turkey

- Sakçe Gözü or Sakçagözü
- Location within Turkey
- 37°11′12″N 36°53′29″E
- Type: Settlement
- Periods: Pottery Neolithic, Halaf, Ubaid, Late Chalcolithic/Uruk and Neo-Hittite
- Location: Nurdağı, Gaziantep Province, Turkey
- Region: Mesopotamia

Site notes
- Height: 6 m (20 ft)
- Length: 140 m (460 ft)
- Width: 90 m (300 ft)
- Area: 1.25 ha (3.1 acres)
- Excavation dates: 1908, 1911, 1949
- Archaeologists: John Garstang, John d'Arcy Waechter

Coba Höyük, (also known as Sakçe Gözü , Sakçagözü, Jobba Euyuk, and Sakje Geuzi), is an archaeological site in southeastern Anatolia. It is located about three kilometers north-west of the modern village of Sakçagözü in Gaziantep Province, Turkey. The site was occupied in the Pottery Neolithic, Halaf, Ubaid, Late Chalcolithic/Uruk and Neo-Hittite periods. The site has now been destroyed by modern activities.

== History ==
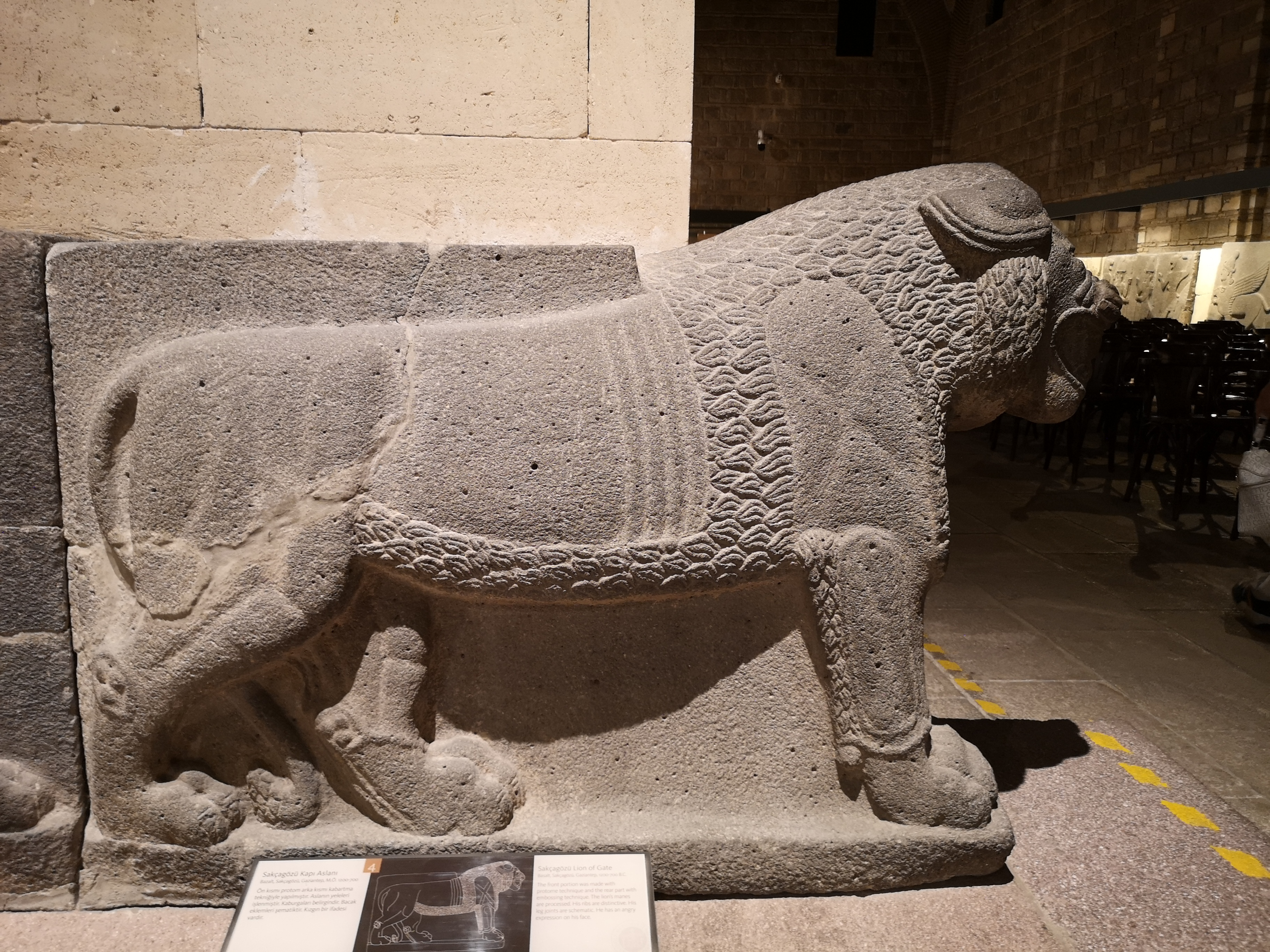
Sakçagözü findings in the Museum of Anatolian Civilisations

The site appears to have been occupied on and off from the second half of the seventh millennium BC until the first millennium BC. The excavations were small scale and an exact stratigraphical sequence cannot reliably be constructed.

In the first millennium BC the site was part of a Neo-Hittite state, the name of the city is not known. City walls and a palace of the bit-hilani type were found at the site and date to around 730-700 B.C.

== Archaeology ==
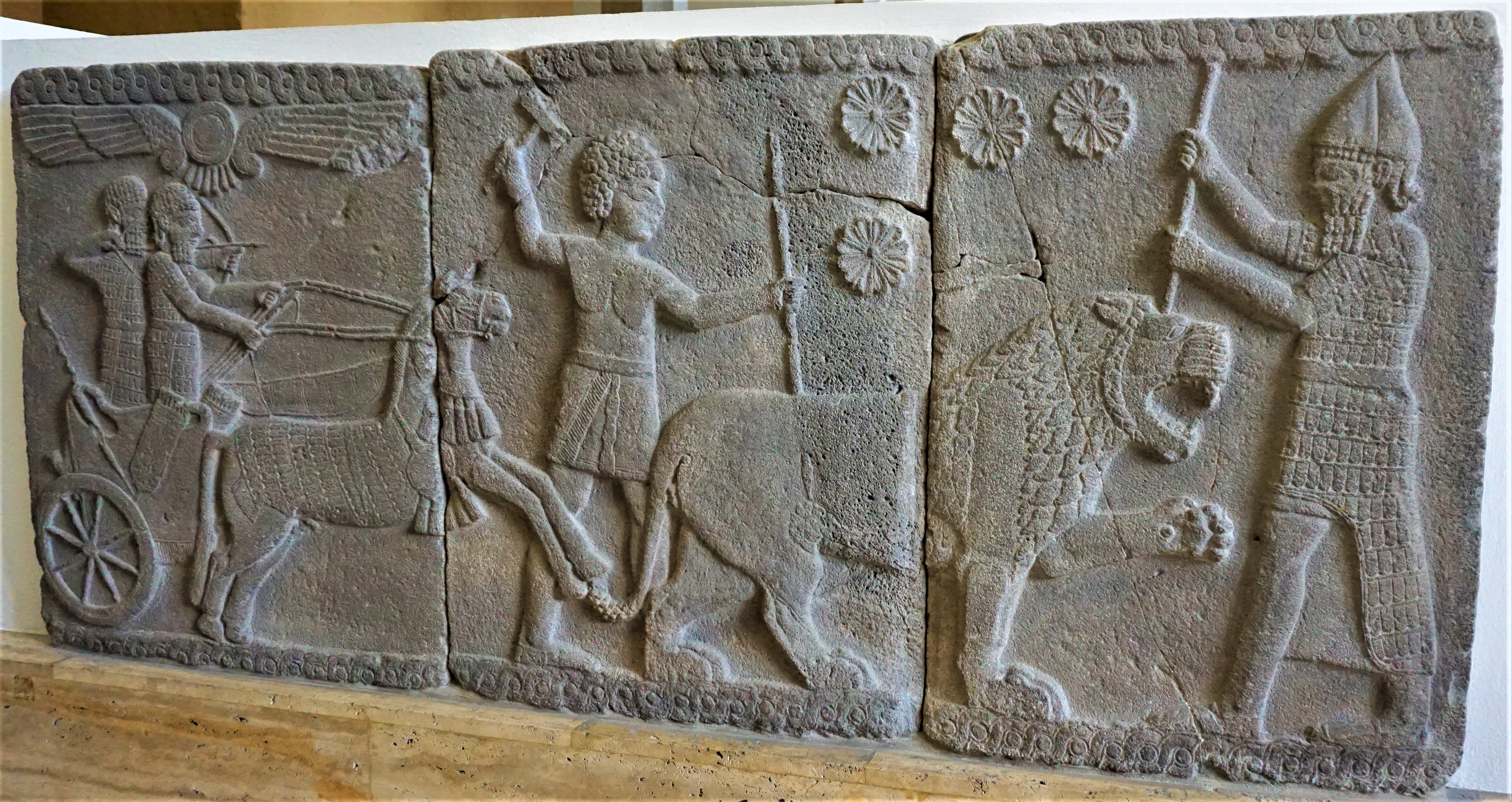
Lion hunt scene, found in the remains of the palace

The site (referred to as Mound A by the early excavator) has an extent of 140 meters by 90 meters and rises 9 meters above the plain, of which 6 meters are occupation remains. At the northeast foot of the mound lies a productive spring.

It was visited by Mary Scott Stevenson in 1881 who noted that there were three basalt orthostats depicting a lion hunt on the wall of a private home there. The site visited by Karl Humann and Felix von Luschan in 1890 where they made some sketches and also removed the three orthostats to take to the Pergamon Museum in Berlin. John Garstang was the first excavator in 1908 and 1911. In addition to excavating the periphery wall of a late Hittite palace, finding reliefs, several trenches were dug finding black incised and burnished ware at the bedrock level. He was interested in the Hittite material on the surface of the site and discovered the portico of a bit hilani Hittite palace, now in Ankara, as well as the earliest excavated Halaf period material culture. Hittite era sculptured reliefs were found, recorded and then buried for safety at the end of excavations.

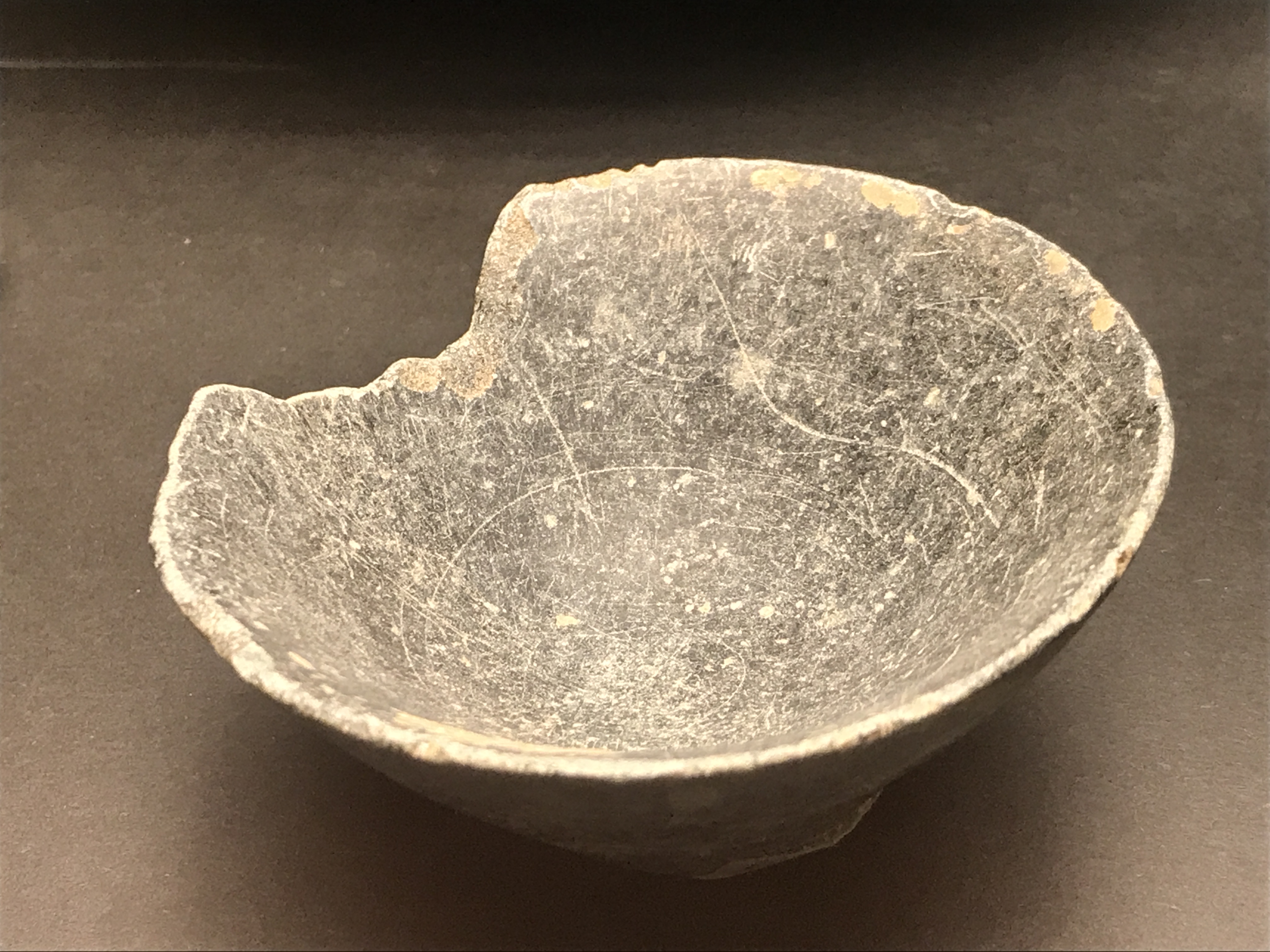
Archaeological Museum of the University of Münster - Coba Bowl from site

In the late 1930s Hans Henning von der Osten dug a sounding on the northeast slope of the mound but the results were not published. The site was re-excavated in 1949 by a team led by John d'Arcy Waechter under the auspices of the British Institute of Archaeology in Ankara, after the removal of the buried portico sculptured friezes by the Turkish authorities in 1939 at the outbreak of the Second World War clearing the surface of the mound.

Periodization of the site is as follows:

- Period I - Late Chalcolithic, pre-Halaf
- Period II - Halaf culture and Samarra culture
- Period III - Developed Halaf
- Period IV - Ubaid period
- Period V - probably Uruk period, Jemdat Nasr period to Early Dynastic
- Periods VH-VIII - Habur period
- Period IX - Syro-Hittite
- Periods X-XI - Post-Hittite building levels, fourth century BC-first century AD
- Period XII - medieval pits

Objects excavated at Sakçagözü can be found at museums such as the Vorderasiatisches Museum in Berlin, the Museum of Anatolian Civilizations in Ankara, and the Istanbul Museum of Ancient Oriental Works. Coba bowls were named after their first description from the excavations at Coba Höyük.

== See also ==
- Tilmen Hoyuk
