= Ah-Muzen-Cab =

Maya god of bees and honey

- God of bees and honey
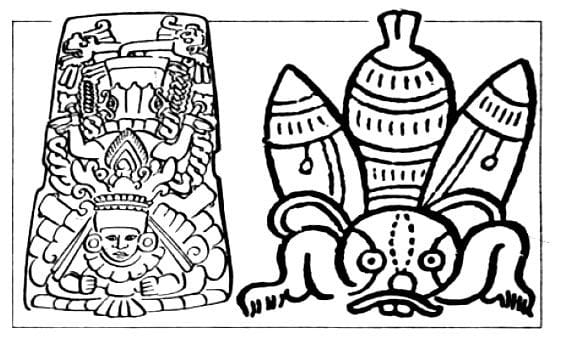
- Animals: Bees

Ah Muzen Cab (also Ah Musen Kab) is the Maya god of bees and honey. He is possibly the same figure as "the Descending God" or "the Diving God" and is consistently depicted upside-down. The Temple of the Descending God is located in Tulum. The bees used by the Maya are Melipona beecheii and Melipona yucatanica, species of stingless bee. Ah Muzen Cab is a Melipona bee.

The deity is the creator of the Earth and Universe in the fourth and final cycle of the cosmos, according to Maya peoples in the Yucatán Peninsula. Ah Muzen Cab is the protector of M. beecheii and goes to the underworld to free trapped life forces. The bee god also unifies Ah Uuk Cheknal and Uuk Taz Kab.

== In the Chilam Balam ==
The Chilam Balam mentions Ah-Muzen-Cab in Chapter I: The Ritual of the Four World Corners, and Chapter X: The Creation of the World. In it, Ah Muzen Cab represents the East and North. He also blindfolded the Oxlahalun-ti-ku, who were then seized and beaten by the Bolon-ti-ku, allowing the incomplete world to be filled by rocks, trees, and seeds.

== In popular culture ==
Ah Muzen Cab is a playable god in the video game Smite.

== See also ==
- Bee (mythology)
- Bacab
- Melipona
- Bees
