= Ni'Ku' =

- Interactive map of Ni'Ku'
- Type: Ancient Maya site
- Periods: Late Postclassic
- Cultures: Maya civilization
- Location: Mexico
- Region: East Coast of Quintana Roo

History
- Built: 1300 - 1520 AD
- Abandoned: c. 1520 after the arrival of Spanish conquistadors

Site notes
- Architectural style: East Coast of Quintana Roo

Ni'Ku' (or Ni'Kú) is a Maya archaeological site in the East Coast of Quintana Roo, Mexico, in front of the Caribbean Sea at Punta Cancún (name by which the archaeological site is also known), within the Cancún Hotel Zone. The site was an ancient ceremonial center and pre-Columbian seaside settlement dating back to the Late Postclassic period of the Maya civilization. Two structures featuring the architectural style of the Quintana Roo East Coast remain preserved in ruins. The existence of the Ni’Ku’ temples was first documented in the 19th century during early archaeological expeditions along the coast of what is now Cancún, following the urban expansion and tourism development the area had between the 1970s and 1980s, the ruins of this ancient Maya ceremonial center ended up within the grounds of a private resort complex so the access to the site is restricted.

== Archaeology ==
The Ni’Kú archaeological site was an ancient Maya ceremonial center and coastal settlement located on the East Coast of Quintana Roo, its occupation and construction date to the Terminal and Late Postclassic periods of Maya civilization and it was primarily dedicated to maritime trade. Structures facing the Caribbean Sea also served as lighthouses along the pre-Columbian maritime trade routes of which the site was a part. Like other cities and ceremonial centers on the eastern coast of Quintana Roo, Ni'Ku' was abandoned shortly after the arrival of Spanish conquistadors on the shores of the Yucatán Peninsula, a result of the region's economic collapse and the drastic population loss caused by disease. The site has a small extension and sits atop a natural rise in a low rocky cliff facing the Caribbean Sea. Although it may have had more buildings during its occupation, two ruined temple-shrine structures currently remain standing, built in the architectural style of the East Coast of Quintana Roo. Archaeological studies indicate that both structures were built with a shared, deliberate orientation designed to mark sunsets on specific days, serving as venues for ceremonies and rituals.

The first records of the existence of pre-Columbian structures on the island of Cancún which at the time was still an empty and uninhabited area were made by the American explorer John Lloyd Stephens in 1843. While traveling the Cancún coast during an archaeological reconnaissance expedition, he documented for the first time the presence of numerous Maya temples and shrines across the island, including those at Ni'Ku' at Punta Cancún.

Between the 1970s and 1980s, Cancún experienced significant urban growth, launching a rapid hotel development drive aimed at establishing the area as a tourist destination. As a result of this regional expansion, the Ni'Ku' archaeological site ended up within the private grounds of a resort complex, a modern hotel building was constructed right next to the ancient Maya structures. Other nearby ancient Maya ceremonial centers met a similar fate, such as Ta’akul and Yamil Lu’um, which just like Ni'ku' were absorbed by large private hotel complexes. There is also the case of the Pok Ta Pok site, which was incorporated into the grounds of a private golf course that is currently abandoned.
