= Sacbe =

Paved roads linking ancient Mayan cities

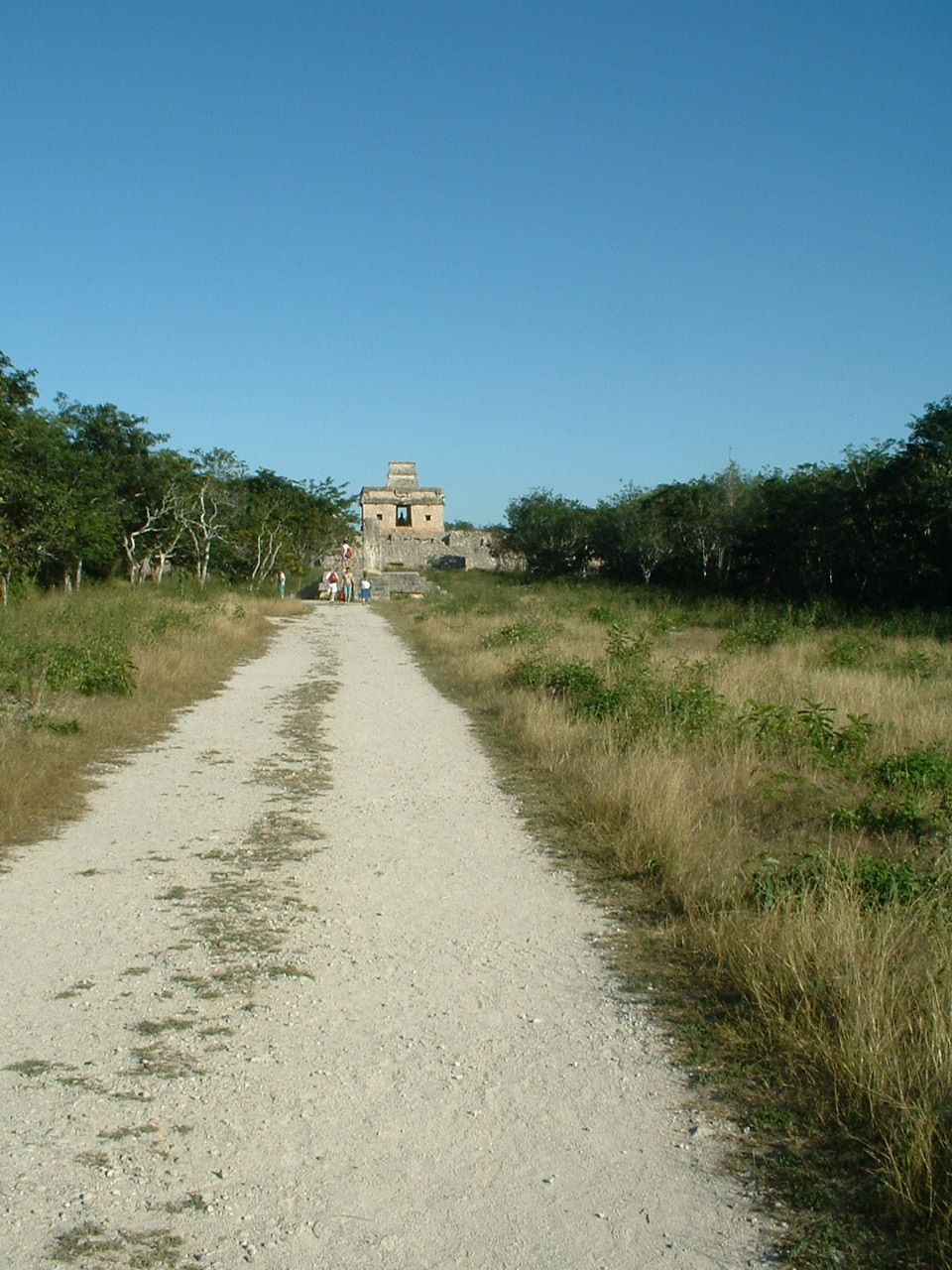
Sacbe at Dzibilchaltun in the Yucatán

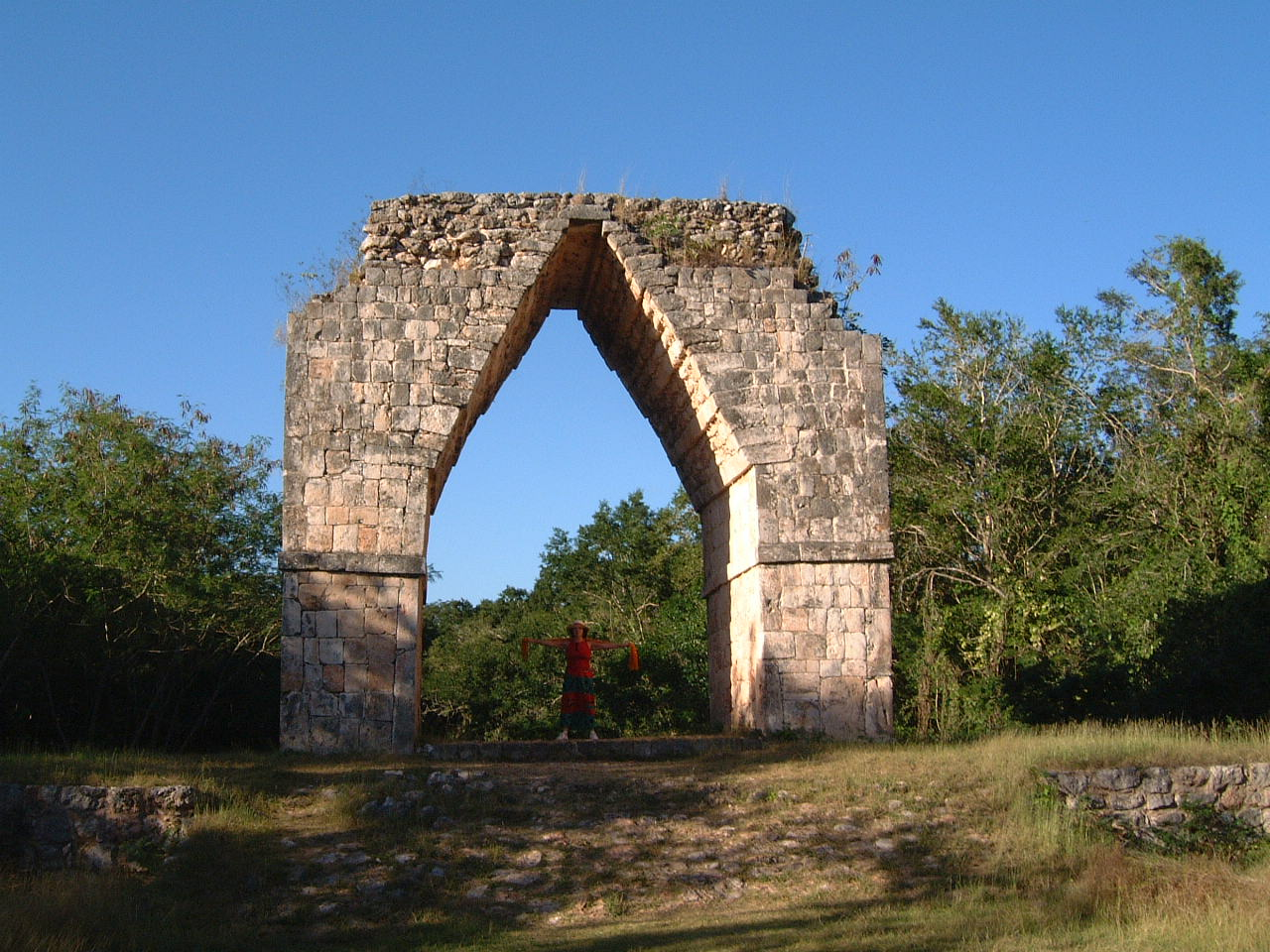
Arch at the end of the sacbé, Kabah, Yucatán

A sacbe, plural sacbeob (Yucatec Maya: singular sakbej, plural sakbejo'ob), or "white road", is a raised paved road built by the Maya civilization of pre-Columbian Mesoamerica. Most connect temples, plazas, and groups of structures within ceremonial centers or cities, but some longer roads between cities are also known. The term "sacbe" is Yucatec Maya for "white road"; white perhaps because there is evidence that they were originally coated with limestone stucco or plaster, which was over a stone and rubble fill. Although great progress has been made on determining the roles of sacbeob in Maya society, the decision to construct sacbeob as opposed to smaller, less complicated paths is puzzling to experts. Without a profound reliance on beasts of burden to transport goods, it remains partially unclear why the Maya decided to expend so much labor constructing these impressive roads. However, it remains a very plausible theory that the Sacbe held significant spiritual and religious value, in the sense that the actual trekking of the Sacbe itself seemed to be a spiritual journey of sorts.

Sacbeob constructed of these materials are especially important to contemporary studies of Maya sites, as they preserve well, making them capable of providing invaluable evidence to archaeologists. Maya "Sacbeob varied greatly in construction, length, width, and function" according to a 2015 study done on the sacbeob of Ceren. It is possible that many non-stone sacbeob once existed throughout Maya territory, however evidence of these earthen roads are limited, as they do not preserve as well.

== Etymology ==
The word Sacbe meaning the white jungle pathways used by the Maya comes from a combination of two Mayan words, "sac" meaning white and "be" or "beh" meaning way, road, or pathway. The word "Beh" operates as the root term for "Sacbe". Beh is spelled alternately as Be, bej, bey, be, bih, as well as "beel" in the possessive.

It has many distinctions from English concepts of roads, pathways, or trails. Beh's metaphoric meanings are just as important if not more important than its literal meaning of "road." Ethnographers working the lowlands have noted that it means "more than the road you see with your eyes." The term Beh refers to "the road of life".

In the Colonial times "Sacbe" was translated as calzada, which is Spanish for "main road/Highway." The literal translation of Sacbe is "white road." This is used to refer to large Mayan constructed roads covered in a white (Sac) surfacing.

== Sacbeob today ==
Many sacbeob can be seen by modern visitors to Maya sites; a prominent one is at Chichen Itza, running from the main group around El Castillo to the Sacred Cenote. Few of the longer roads still exist in their entirety. A well-known sacbe connects Uxmal with Kabah, which is marked by corbel arches at either end. The 62-mile-long (100-kilometer) road connecting the ancient cities of Coba and Yaxuna was for decades the longest known to archaeologists. The remains of an even longer route have recently received the attention of archaeologists. This long sacbe apparently ran from the site of Ti'ho (modern Mérida, Yucatán), through such sites as Ake and Izamal, to the Caribbean Sea near modern Puerto Morelos, a total distance of some 300 km. In modern times, some of the ancient sacbeob have been used as bases or incorporated into modern highways and railway lines. In contemporary times, researchers have mapped sacbeob quite extensively in cases where the roads radiate out from cities (i.e. Calakmul). However, sacbeob in between cities are less frequently mapped, since they go through areas of extremely dense jungle.

In an effort to map Maya sacbeob more effectively, researchers have more recently turned to radar imaging. This form of mapping has the power to penetrate dense forest cover to reveal the sacbeob below, and is a sound alternative to LiDAR or traditional mapping practices, as they are often time-consuming and costly.

== Historical use ==
Although much of the chronology and the time of origin is somewhat vague due to unclear historical records, there is a large possibility that the Sacbe is one of the oldest and longest traditions of the Maya. All sacbeob apparently had ritual or religious significance for pilgrimages. Travel writer and early Mayanist John Lloyd Stephens reported that some local Maya people in Yucatán still said a short ritual prayer when crossing a sacbe in the early 1840s, even though they had been overgrown with jungle for centuries at the time. He is said to have been pleased to have discovered evidence of large, well-constructed sacbeob, reports of which he had previously believed to be exaggerations on the part of the Spanish conquistadores. These preliminary reports included that of Diego López de Cogolludo, a chronicler from the 16th or 17th century, who noted that "there are remains of paved highways which traverse all this kingdom".

Sacbeob had a number of practical uses in addition to any religious significance they may have had. In addition to their large spiritual significance, archeologists have long used the Sacbe to construct and understand the political and economic systems of the Maya. By understanding the larger connection between settlements along the Sacbe, archeologists have been able to gain a larger understanding into the political and social network that the Sacbe facilitated. Longer sacbeob could be used for trade and communication. The Maya did not have a beast of burden suitable for carrying goods over long distances, so it is likely that the sacbeob would have been regularly walked by traders, though the Maya are also known to have used water routes. There is a wealth of evidence of mounds, often interpreted as remains of huts or way stations for travelers, along large sacbeob. Looking at the large sacbe connecting Kabah to Uxmal, natives told John Lloyd Stephens that ancient Maya couriers used the sacbeob to deliver messages between large cities. At Ake in the Yucatán, several sacbeob lead directly to cenotes, which serve both as important religious sites and sources of clean water.

Stone stelae and platforms were frequently added to the sacbeob to delineate the end of a sacbe, or the point of crossing for two sacbeob. Ramps, stairs, and other features meant to facilitate the use of sacbeob by pedestrians have been routinely observed, and seem to increase in abundance the closer one gets to prominent architectural features of a site.

Sacbeob have been found to be in close association with water sources at many sites, including the Sacred Cenote of Chichen Itza, which acts as a terminal point for a local sacbe. Other sites have reservoirs positioned closely to sacbeob, including the site at Caracol.

At Coba, there are more than 50 sacbeob still visible today. Some researchers believe that some of the sacbeob were used to divide the population of about 55,000 people into at least four barrios or neighborhoods. Many smaller sacbeob fall in places around sources of water or other high-traffic areas like ceremonial or administrative centers. Two much larger sacbeob connect Coba to the smaller sites of Yaxuna, almost 100 km to the west, and Ixil, about 20 km to the southwest. Since Coba is the only major Classic Period site in a 5,000 square kilometer area around it, Yaxuna and Ixil are believed to be outposts or subsidiaries of Coba, which would have been the capital of the state in which they all resided. Extensive research at Coba, including the use of imaging technology, has revealed that the sacbeob here are not as straight as previously thought. Furthermore, it seems that settlements continue to follow the path of the sacbe for some time as it leads out of the central portion of the site. This information shows just how influential these causeways were in the lives of local residents. Examination of the Coba-Yaxuna sacbe yielded an especially important find: a five-ton stoneroller resting atop the surface of the sacbe. It is believed that this roller was used to compact the surface of the sacbe to ensure a smooth, uniform walking surface.

At the Maya site of Cerén, located in El Salvador, studies of preserved plant material have revealed that sacbeob were used to transport goods amongst the agricultural fields in this area. It is also important to note that the sacbeob at Cerèn were used as an evacuation route after the Loma Caldera eruption of the San Salvador volcano.

Some sacbeob that have been studied in the northwest Yucatán seem to have been constructed at times of conflict, rapid population growth and migration, and they have been interpreted by some as "permanent markers attesting to the relationships between dominant centers and satellite settlements," effectively a way of signifying and maintaining political boundaries.

While the sacbeob in the Yucatán are the best known, they are documented elsewhere in the Maya area. A number of sacbeob have been found around El Mirador and Tikal in the northern Petén Basin and around Copan in the southern Guatemalan Highlands, as well as at other sites.

The territory of the Maya at its height was expansive, and included many different types of terrain, climate, and ecological zones. Therefore, those constructing the sacbeob had to take into account the conditions of their specific region to ensure the longevity of the sacbeob. At the site of Cerèn, drainage was required on the sides of the sacbe, as well as regular maintenance by laborers due to the wet conditions in this area.

Many theories surrounding the construction of the sacbeob have been posed. Although a general consensus has not been reached, experts believe that sacbeob presence in some areas is the result of the work of corvée labor groups. This theory has been supported by the existence of completed sacbeob segments next to unstarted ones.

Besides practical function, the symbolic functions of sacbeob are critical to understanding their significance in Maya culture. Sacbeob served to provide both a physical and symbolic link between two places. It is argued that this link served as a reminder of the relationship between the groups that occupied a specific sacbe. By jointly participating in the construction and frequent maintenance of these roadways, it is believed that societies could further solidify their allyship.

== Cosmic and ceremonial reference ==
Movement may hold a certain ceremonial and spiritual power in Maya culture. According to some Mayan beliefs some forms of illness can be diagnosed by the movement of various forces through the body and the world. Rituals, including curing the sick, pilgrimage, procession, and dedication, involve movement as a generative source of power, capable of change and influence. It has been recorded that "sacbeob were frequently joined to important temple and palace architecture by ramps or stairways, making them part of large, complex ritual stations", further highlighting their religious importance.

The present day and colonial Maya term for the Milky Way is also Sacbe. The fulfilment of one's destiny is considered the fulfilment of their "road." Seeing that movement, roads, and the cosmos are important to Mayan mythos, the conflation of Sacbe with the Milky Way suggests a ceremonial importance of Sacbe.

Sacbeob have been observed to correspond to the four cardinal directions when extending from pilgrimage centers, which is also believed to be spiritually significant. The connection made between sacbeob and the Milky Way has also been theorized to be connected to the Maya concept of the World Tree, or Wakah-Chan. In this way, the sacbeob acted as an axis mundi, meaning that to some extent, sacbeob may have functioned as a model for the Maya universe.

Similarly, at the site of El Mirador, sacbeob seem to have been constructed to represent an astronomical alignment between the Sun and Venus, which has been analyzed as further evidence of sacbeob holding a religious significance. The Coba causeways are also theorized to be intentionally aligned with certain stars.

At the ancient site of Cerèn, tephra, a volcanic material gathered from a previous eruption, was used to construct the local sacbe. The societal and environmental impacts of this past eruption are thought to have been enormous. Therefore, a study conducted by Sheets et al. concluded that construction of the Cerèn sacbe from these materials likely had religious and cosmological significance to the Maya.

== See also ==
- Trade in Maya civilization
