= East Coast of Quintana Roo =

Geographical region of the Maya civilization

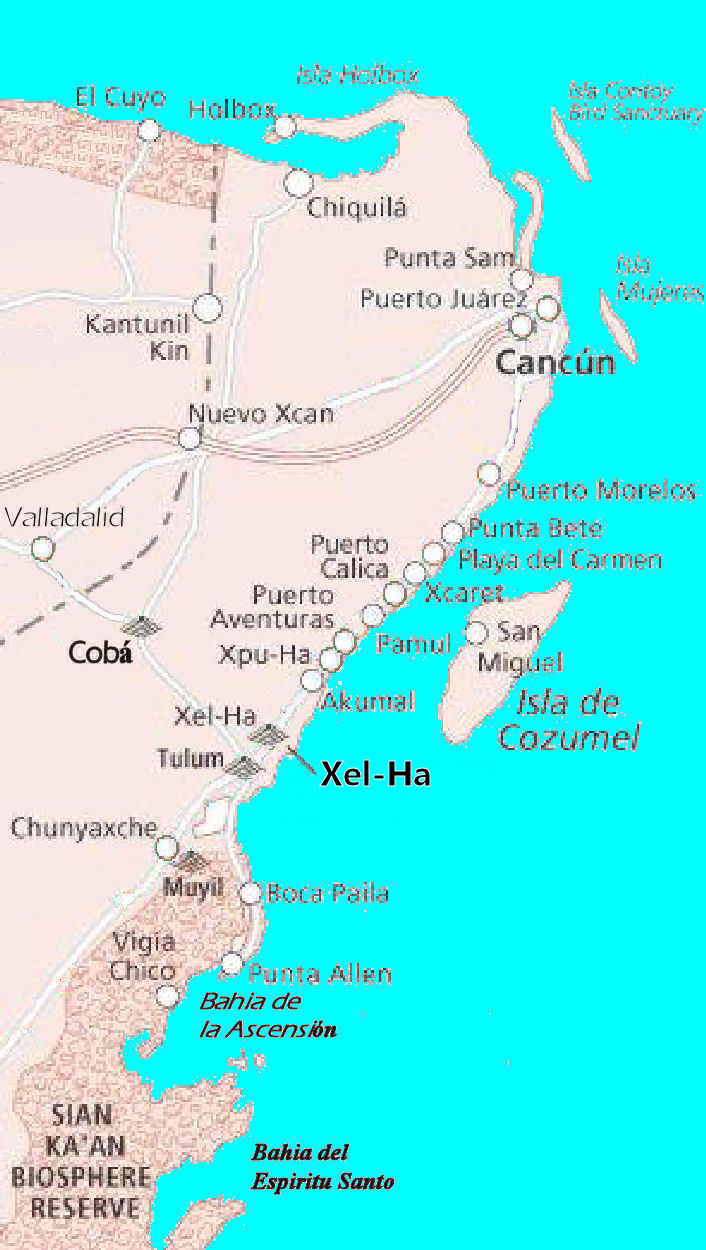
Map of the East Coast of Quintana Roo.

The East Coast of Quintana Roo is an archaeological region of the Maya culture located on the eastern coast of the state of Quintana Roo and the island of Cozumel in Mexico bordering the Caribbean Sea. The region is characterized by a unique architectural style with shared archaeological elements by the sites along the coast, its most representative features are the temples with circular columns carved with sculptures, shrines, murals, ports and defensive walls.

The East Coast of Quintana Roo developed during the Post-classic period of the Maya civilization until the arrival and encounter with the Spanish conquistadors between the years 1200 and 1550 AD. The sites are built on the shores of the Caribbean Sea on beach coves between lagoons and mangroves, a geographical location that turned the cities into major commercial ports connected by an extensive coastal maritime trade network. The geography of the region was also a significant aspect within Maya mythology, the ocean was venerated and ceremonial temples and shrines were built across the region to different deities mainly to the goddess Ixchel, such as the one located on Cozumel island, which became sacred Maya pilgrimage centers for the pre-Hispanic inhabitants.

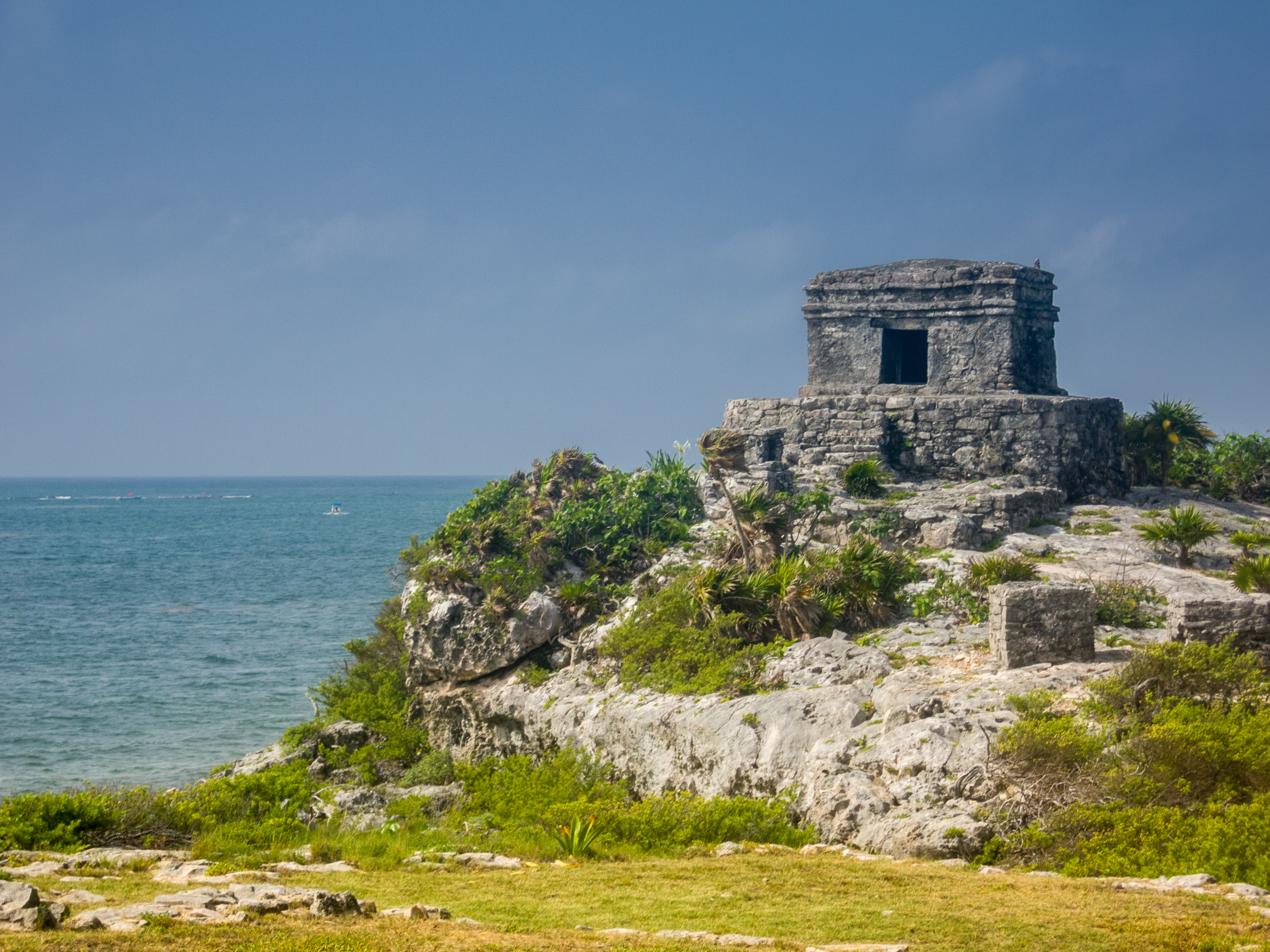
Temple of the Wind God, Tulum

The Maya sites of the East Coast are: Tulum, Xelha, Xcaret, Muyil, El Meco, El Rey, Tankah, Chakalal, Tupak, Chamax, Xaman Há, San Gervasio, Xlahpak (or Vigía del Lago), Xcalacoco, Chac Mool, Chenchomac, Rancho Ina (or Calica), San Miguelito, Oxamach, Xpu Há, Paamul, Yamil Lu’um, Isla Mujeres, Pok Ta Pok, Paso de la Viuda, Tampak, Kaa’Peechen, Ni'Ku’, Pu Ha, Ta’akul, Hunal Kunah, Satachannah, Punta Piedra, Tu Chi Kaknab, cueva Ocho Balas, among others.

== Location ==
The East Coast of Quintana Roo region encompasses the coastal area north of Cancún, the Riviera Maya, and the Sian Ka'an Biosphere Reserve, as well as the islands of Cozumel and Isla Mujeres in the state of Quintana Roo, Mexico.

== Architectural style ==
The Maya sites of the East Coast share common architectural elements and characteristics that encompass the East Coast style of Maya architecture. One feature implemented in the region is the flat roofs inside temples and buildings, unlike the traditional arched vaults used in Maya buildings in other regions during earlier times.

=== Adoratories ===
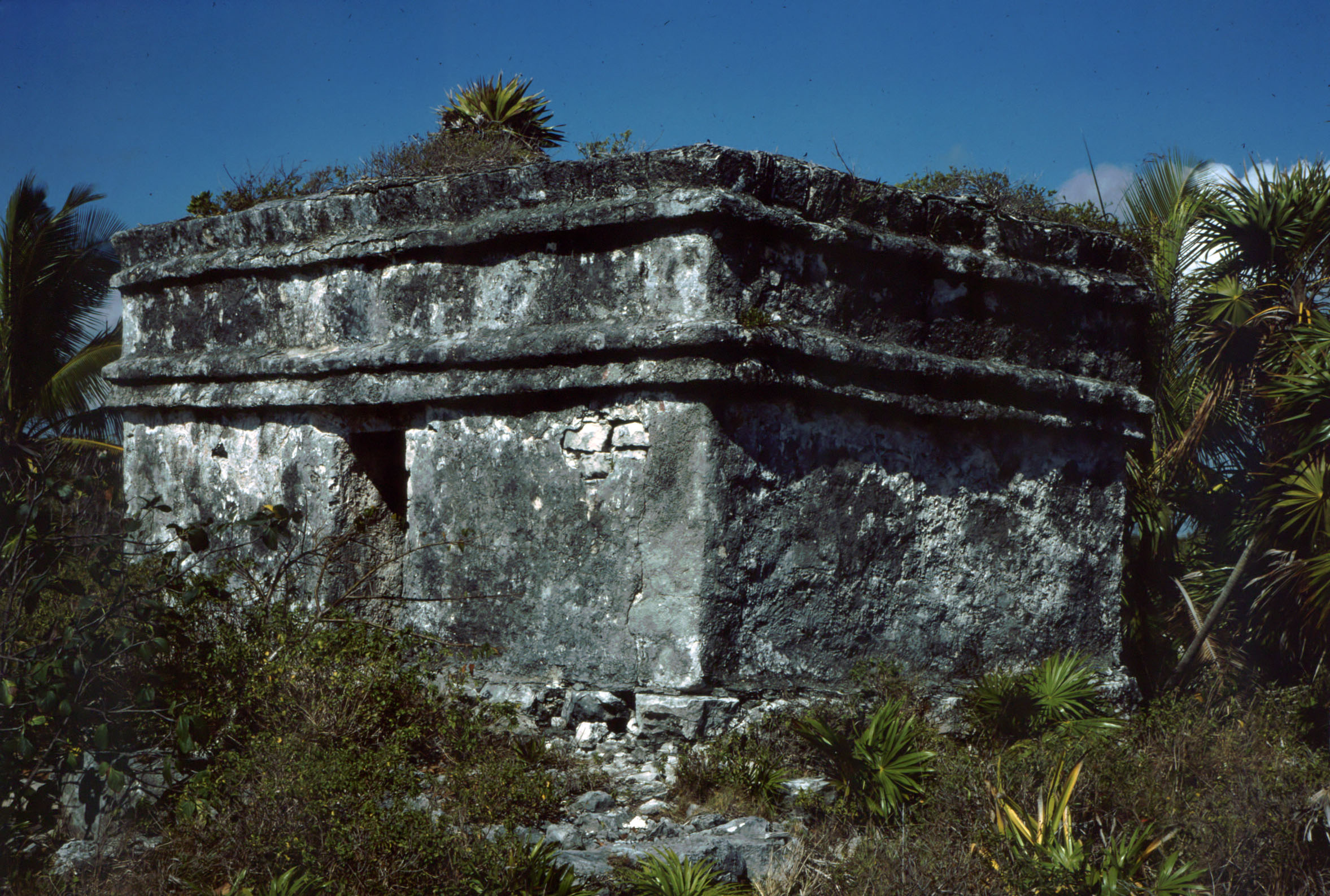
Shrine of Chakalal

One of the most distinctive and representative constructions of the region are the unique adoratories or shrines dedicated to different deities, mostly to the goddess Ixchel who represented the moon and fertility. the Maya shrines are small square buildings with a single entrance, found on the shores of the sea or bodies of water near the site to which they belong, this structures have also been found inside temples or inside cenotes.

== History ==
Evidence of human presence on the coast of Quintana Roo dates back to before the start of the Preclassic period of Mesoamerica. The earliest settlements on the East Coast date back to the middle-late Preclassic period in places like Yox Xixim and Kocholnah, this development continued during the Classic period although, during that time this were only small fishing communities settled facing the sea and dependent on larger sites in the interior of the Yucatán Peninsula such as Coba. After the Classic Maya collapse, with the establishment of Mayapan as a hegemonic power at the beginning of the Postclassic period and under the control of Chichén Itzá, the East Coast had a major development due to its maritime trade network. For navigation, the ancient Maya used dugout canoes; this type of transport is documented in the murals and the Dresden Codex of Chichén Itzá and several later colonial Spanish documents. Between 1517 and 1518, the first Spanish expeditions arrived on the eastern coast of the Yucatán Peninsula, beginning a period of decline in the cities of the East Coast. The sites slowly decreased their populations due to wars and diseases until they were completely abandoned between 1550 and 1600 when only a few inhabitants remained in the region and the cities were left in ruins.

Archaeology of the East Coast of Quintana Roo

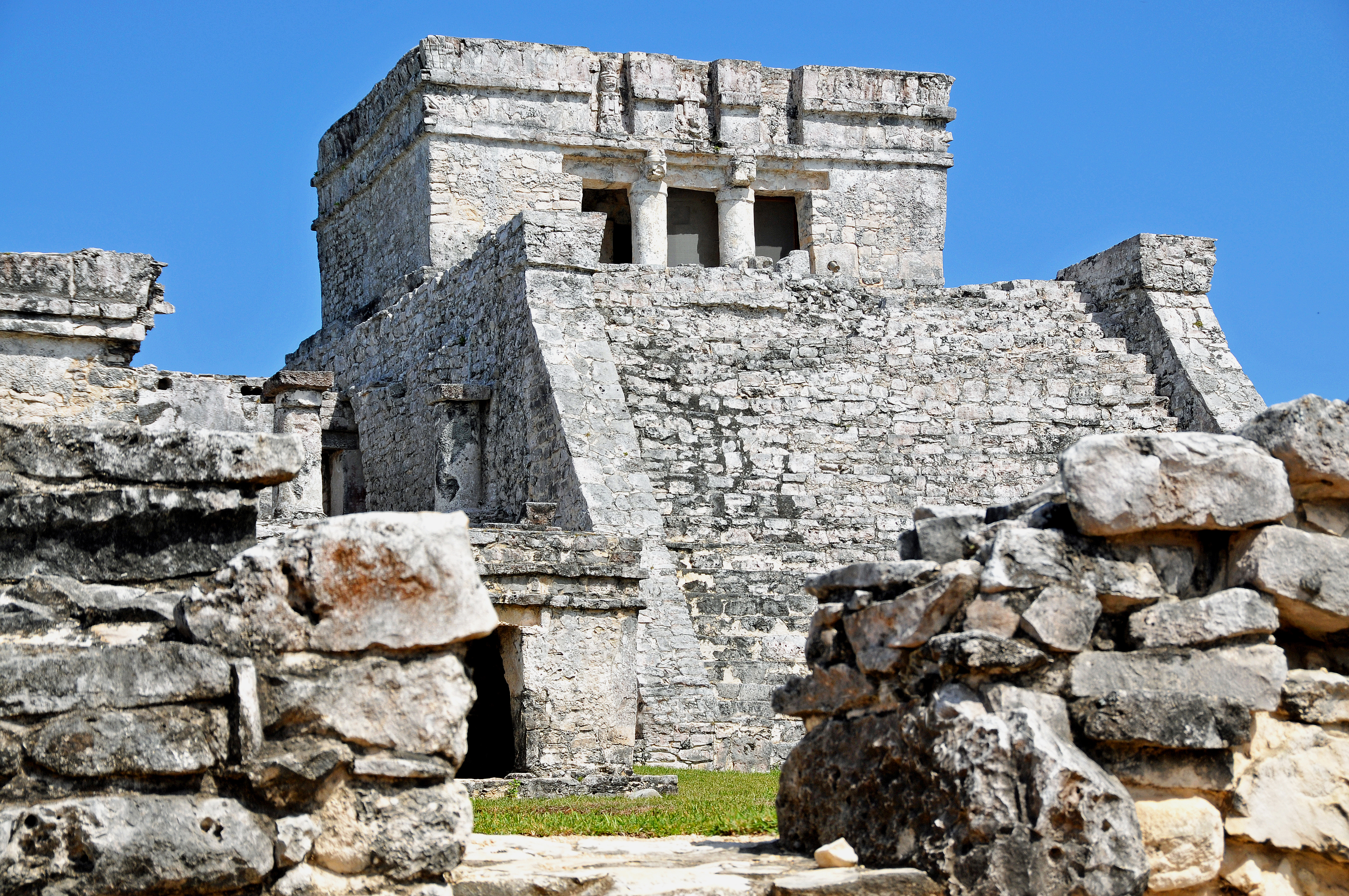
El Castillo of Tulum

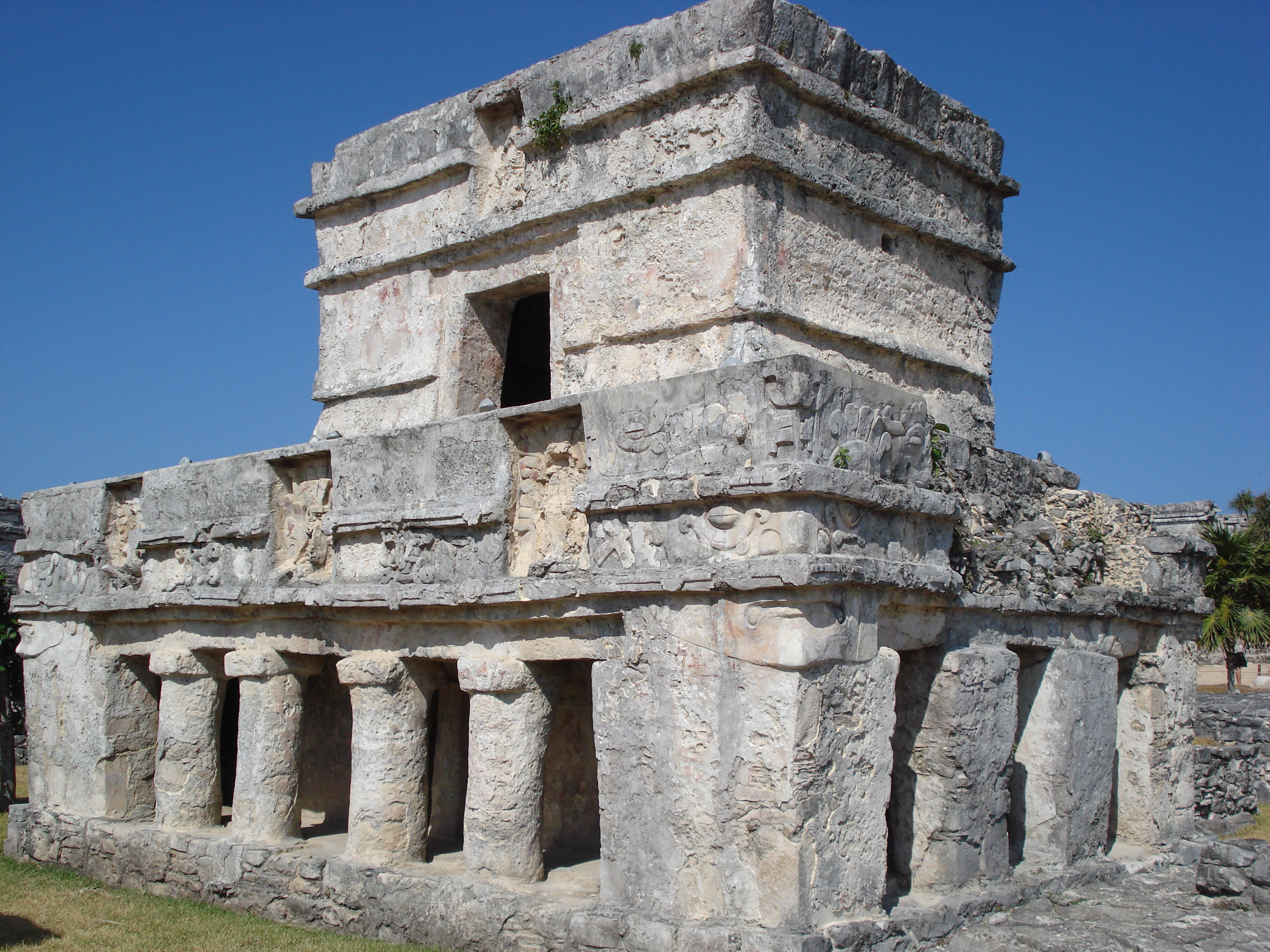
Temple of the Frescoes, Tulum

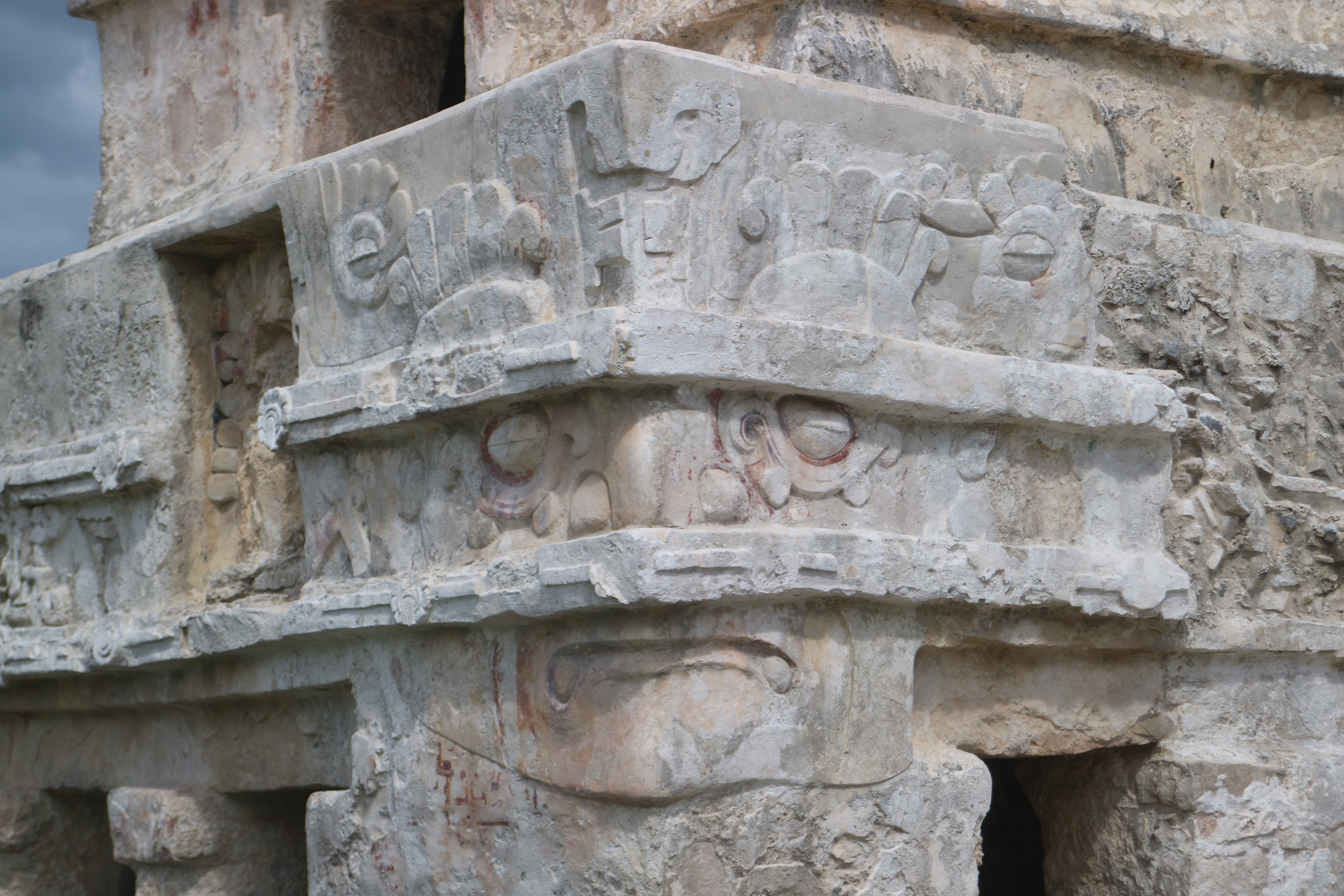
Stucco mask, Tulum

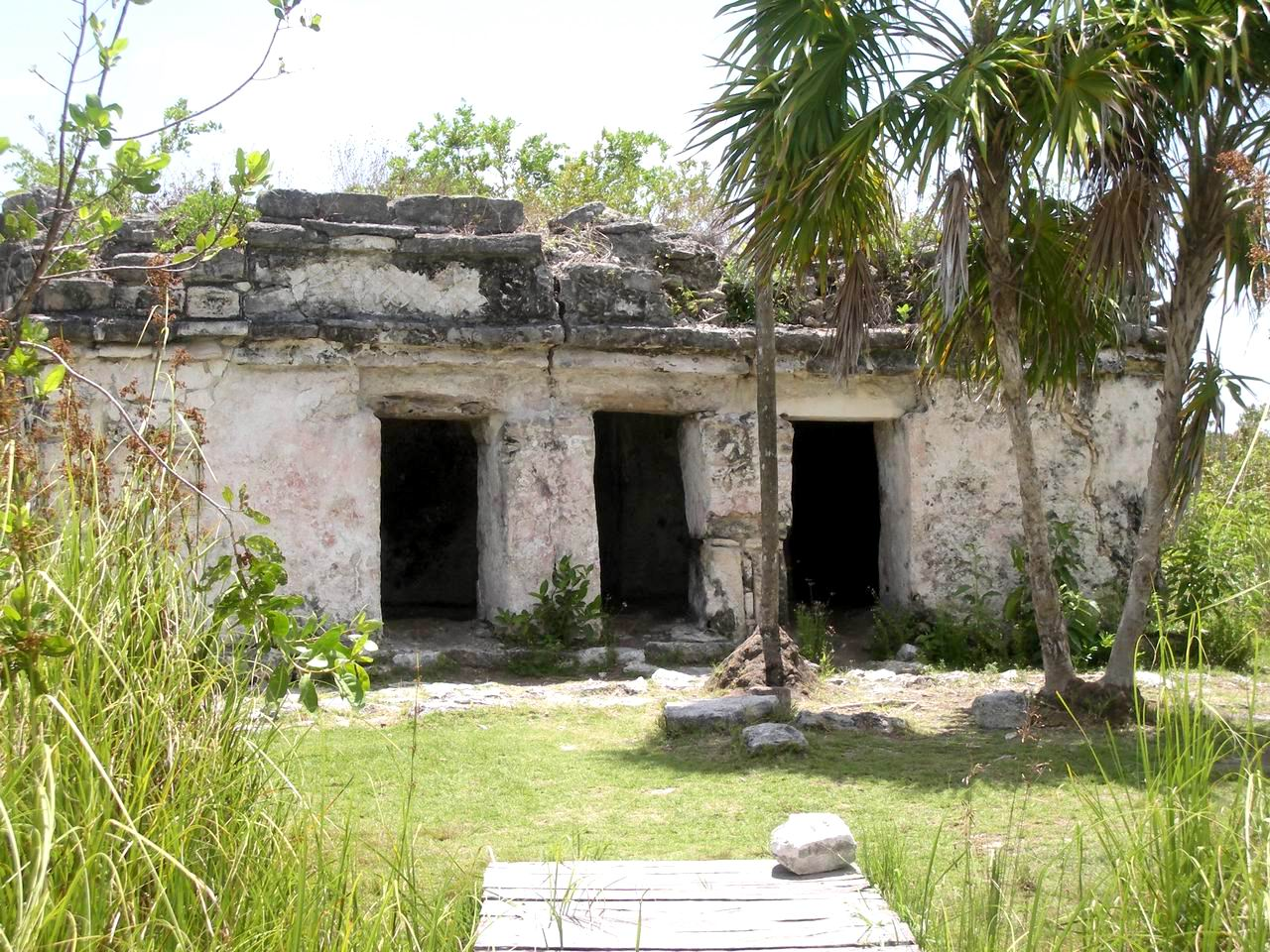
Temple at Xlahpak

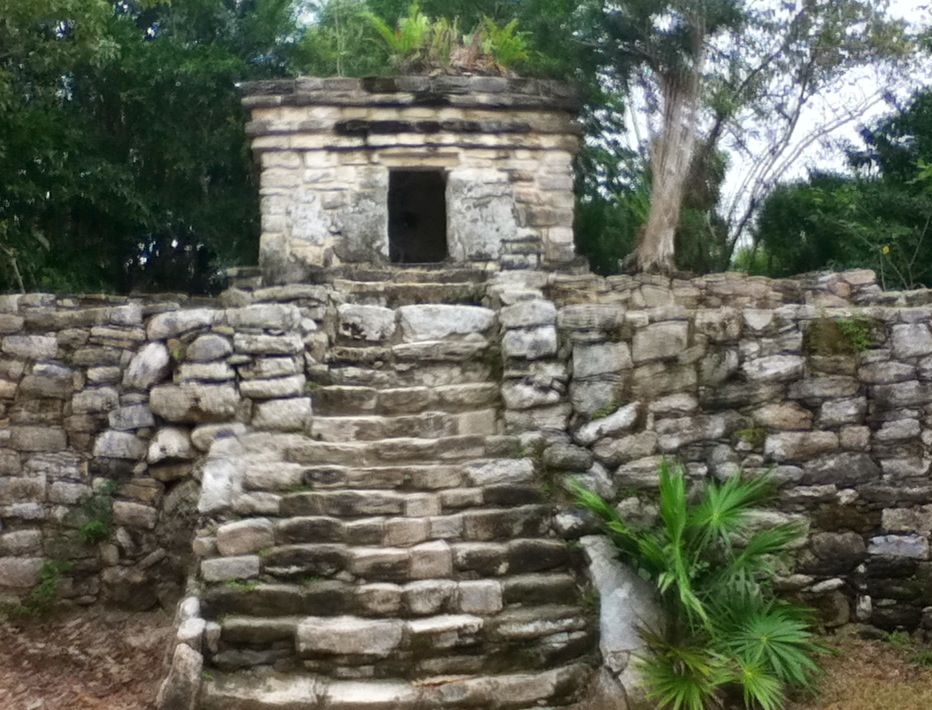
Temple at Xcaret

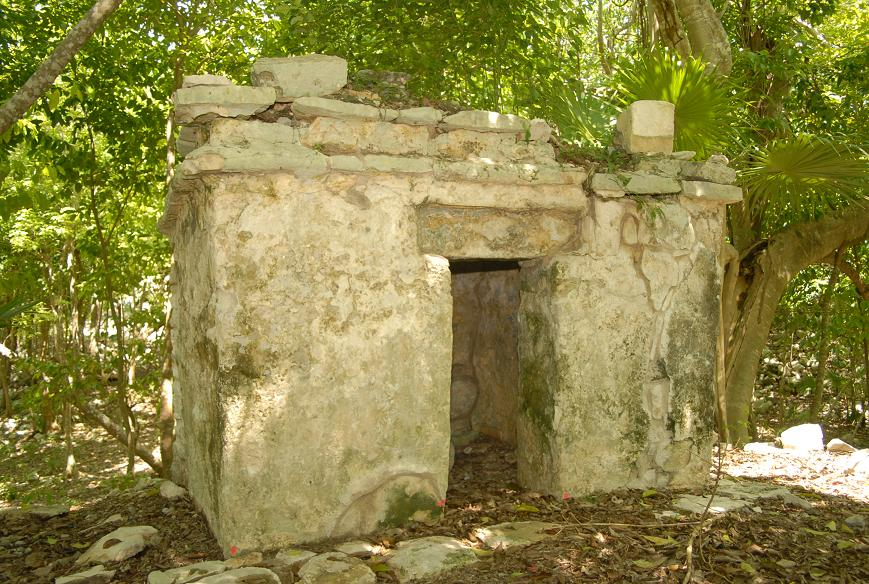
Shrine at Tankah

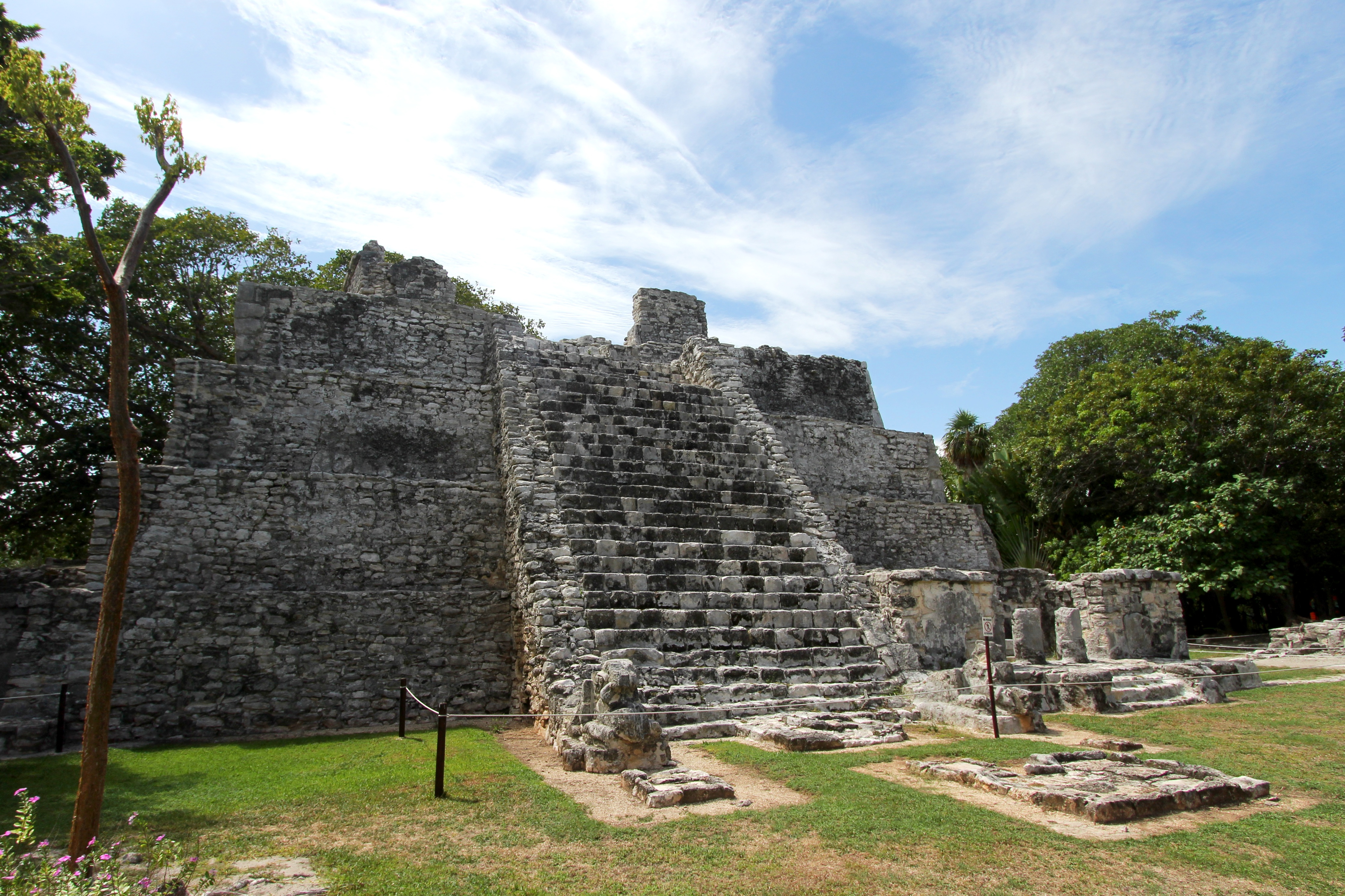
El Castillo of El Meco

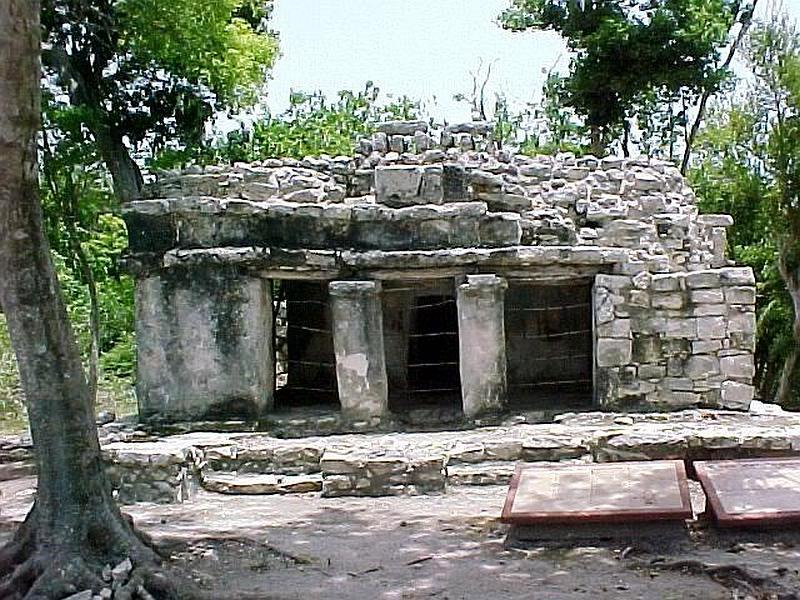
Temple at Xelha

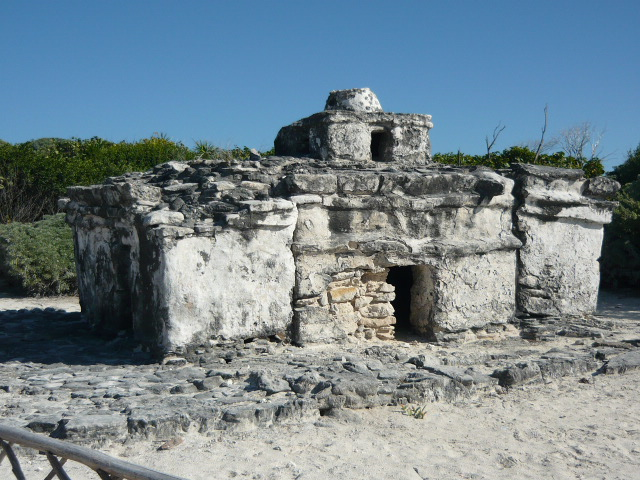
El Caracol, Cozumel
