= Pok Ta Pok =

Maya site in Cancún, Mexico

- Interactive map of Pok Ta Pok
- Periods: Late Postclassic
- Cultures: Maya civilization
- Location: Mexico
- Region: East Coast of Quintana Roo

History
- Built: 1200 - 1521 AD

Site notes
- Architectural style: East Coast of Quintana Roo
- Public access: Restricted

Pok Ta Pok is a Maya archaeological site dating from the Late Postclassic period located near the Nichupté lagoon in the Hotel Zone of Cancún in northern Quintana Roo, Mexico. The site is part of the Maya region of the East Coast of Quintana Roo and according to its characteristics, it was a Postclassic ceremonial center near the site of El Rey. The site consists of 2 ruined structures of the East Coast architectural style. With the urban and tourist expansion that took place in the Cancun hotel zone between the 1970s and 1980s, the ruins of Pok Ta Pok ended up within the private lands of a now-abandoned golf course.

== Archaeology ==
Pok Ta Pok was a Maya ceremonial center from the late Postclassic period in the East Coast region of Quintana Roo, built on the Nichupté lagoon system. This is one of several Maya archaeological sites registered in the Cancun Hotel Zone during the 1970s, as part of an archaeological survey project after numerous reports of looting and destruction of Maya sites that remained unknown and unexplored and that began to resurface due to the urban development projects in Cancun. During this process of urban expansion, Pok Ta Pok ended up within a golf course. In the same area, other nearby Maya sites are Ni'Ku', Yamil Lu'um and Ta'akul, all within private tourist complexes; Yox Xixim, located on the beach; and, further south, San Miguelito and El Rey. The original name of the site is unknown, as no monuments with hieroglyphic inscriptions have been found. The toponym “Pok Ta Pok” was adopted because it is located on the golf course of the same name. This term is often associated with the type of Mesoamerican ballgame that was played in Yucatán and northern Quintana Roo, although recent archaeological research indicates that the correct name for this ritual practice in the region was actually pokol pok. Structure 1 of Pok Ta Pok is a stone platform with the remains of a room wall, an entrance, and two columns inside. Structure 2 is a traditional shrine of the region, built on a platform with a staircase that provided access to the building. The roofs of both structures are destroyed, and originally the walls were covered in stucco, some remnants of which are still preserved.

The modern golf course where the site is located was abandoned, for some time there was a plan to build a large residential center on the land that could have endangered the ruins of Pok Ta Pok, but it was cancelled after several protests about the environmental impact, currently the whole place is abandoned and covered under thick jungle vegetation.
