= El Meco =

Archaeological site in Mexico

- Beel'maan
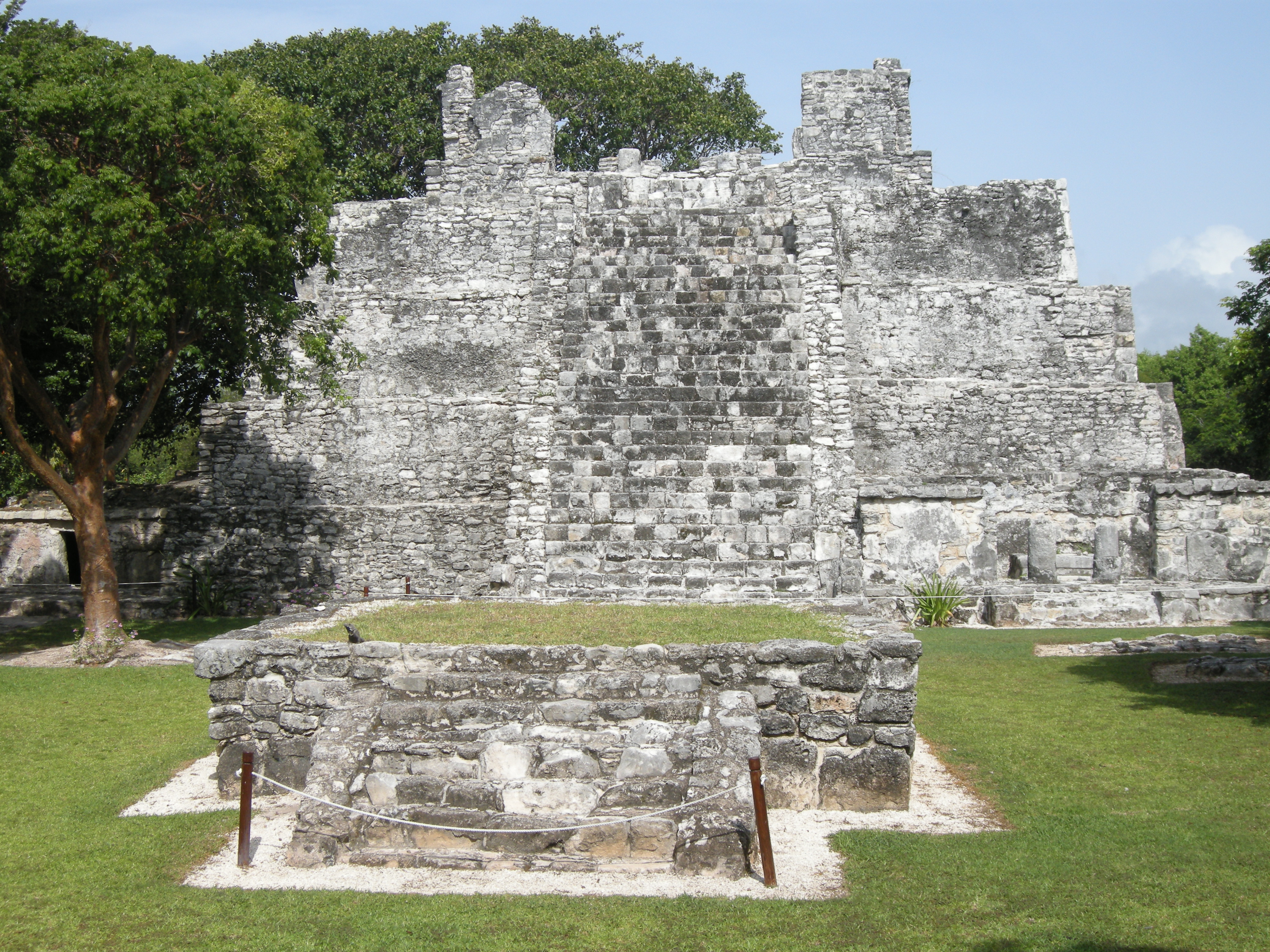
- The Castle (El Castillo) of El Meco

- Location within Mexico Location within Quintana Roo
- Periods: Postclassic
- Cultures: Maya civilization
- Location: Mexico
- Region: East Coast of Quintana Roo

History
- Built: 1200 - 1500

Site notes
- Architectural style: East Coast of Quintana Roo

El Meco, anciently known as Beel'maan, is an archaeological Maya site located on the Caribbean coast of northern Quintana Roo, Mexico, eight kilometers north of Cancún. El Meco was a major Pre-Columbian Maya port city and maritime trade site on the East Coast of Quintana Roo during the Postclassic period of the Maya civilization until the arrival of the Spanish conquistadors.

The site includes several ceremonial structures, altars and shrines distributed around a main plaza. The main building is a pyramid temple known as "El Castillo" ("The Castle"), the tallest Maya building on the East Coast of Quintana Roo, whose front of the temple faces the sea, which gave this structure a great ceremonial significance, being also a major Maya pilgrimage site in the region.

== History ==
El Meco was founded as a small fishing settlement during the Classic period, around the year 600 AD, the settlement was related to Coba as a dependent village and it was originally known as Beel'maan which translates to "Trade Channel". During the Postclassic period, the East Coast of Quintana Roo had a major economical and political development, El Meco was now closely related to Chichen Itza and Mayapan and reached its peak of development as one of the biggest trade centers of the Caribbean coast during the 1200 to 1500 being an important site on the Maya maritime navigation route, due to its location facing Isla Mujeres, El Meco was most likely the port to travel to the island.

== Architecture ==
=== El Castillo ===
El Castillo (The Castle) also known as Structure 1, is the main structure of El Meco, it is a five-level pyramid with a height of 12.5 meters and a temple at the top, it is also the largest Maya building in the region of the Eastern Coast of Quintana Roo by height. El Castillo temple is built facing the sea coast, being the only Maya temple whose front faces the ocean, the function of this orientation was to observe the sunset.

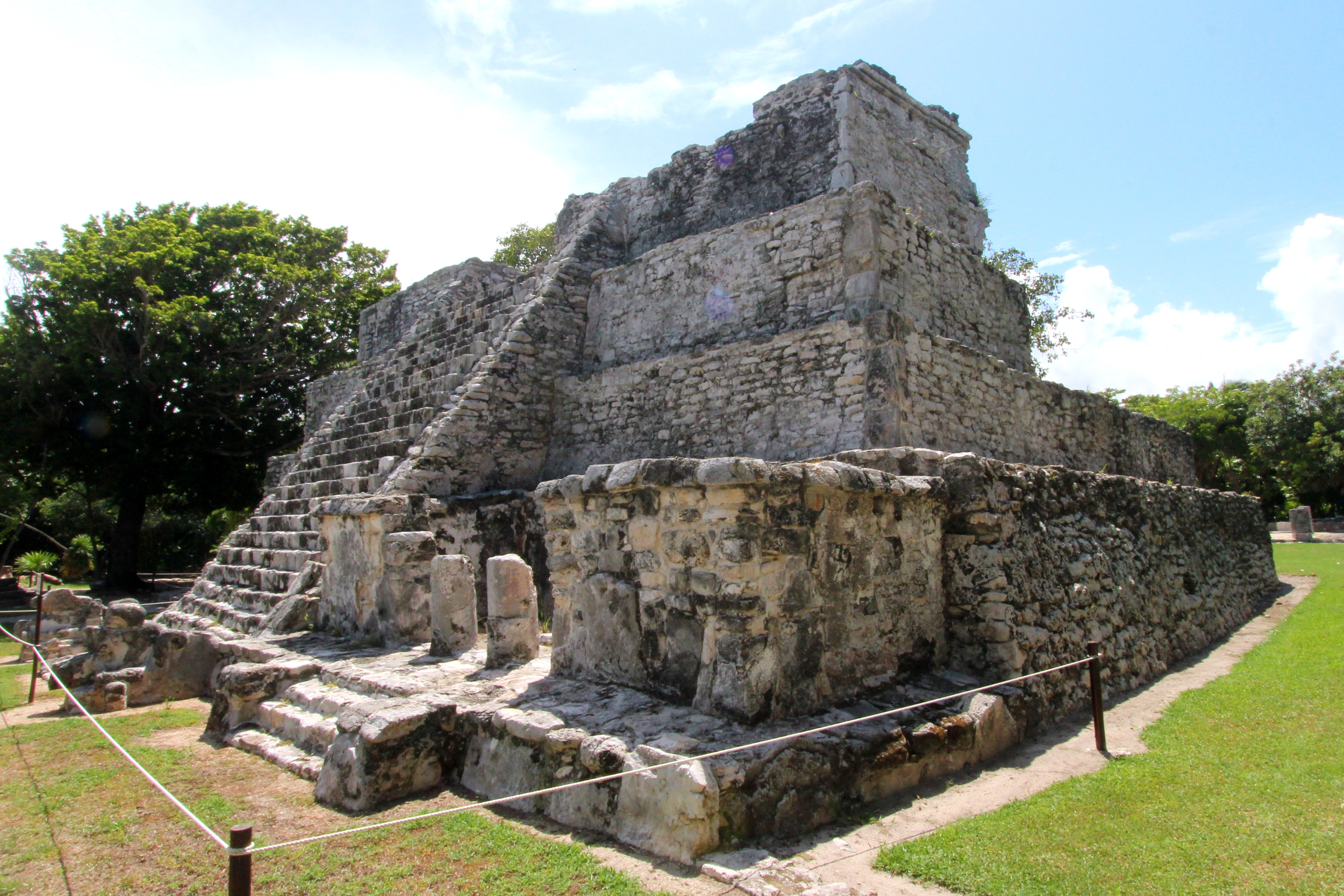
The Castle of El Meco
