= Rancho Ina =

Rancho Ina / Calica
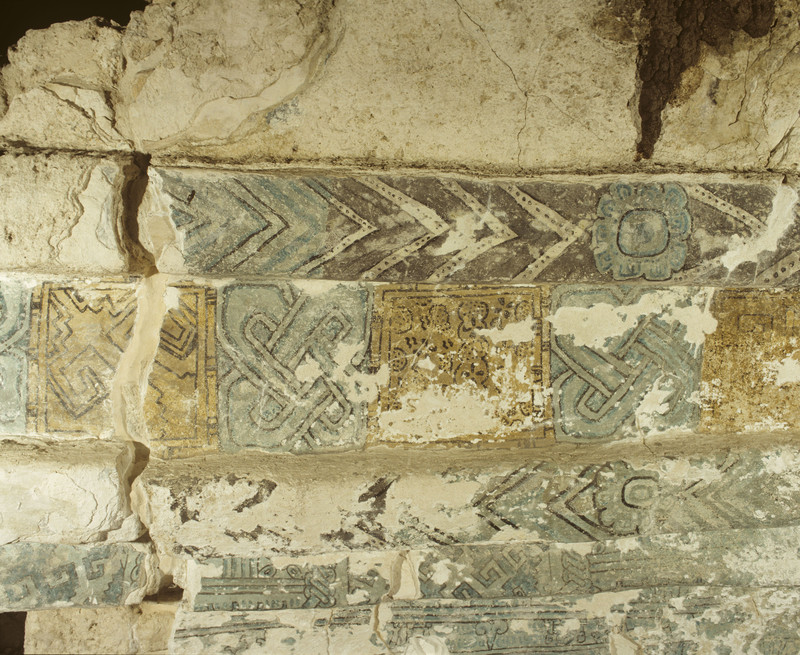
- Decorative mural painting on the frieze of the Casa Azul (Blue House) at Rancho Ina.
- Interactive map of Rancho Ina / Calica
- Type: Ancient Maya site
- Periods: Late Postclassic
- Cultures: Maya civilization
- Location: Mexico
- Region: East Coast of Quintana Roo

History
- Built: 1200 - 1550 AD

Site notes
- Architectural style: East Coast of Quintana Roo

Rancho Ina is the name given to an archaeological Maya site of the late Postclassic period located in the East Coast of Quintana Roo region in Mexico. It is located 1.2 kilometers from the Caribbean Sea coast in front of Cozumel Island and within the lands of what was formerly the limestone extraction company called Calica (now called Sac-Tun), which is why the archaeological complex is also commonly known as Calica, it includes Group P of Xcaret and several cenotes with caverns like Kaahú Hum and Yikliil Cab. The site was developed during the late Postclassic period of the Maya civilization and consists of a large platform with several structures built with the architectural style of the East Coast of Quintana Roo, among them, the most notable building is the Temple of the Columns which inside contains a shrine considered one of the Maya buildings with the best-preserved original painting called the Blue House (Casa Azul) for being covered in the Maya blue color.

== Architecture ==
The Rancho Ina or Calica architectural complex is located in the continental territory of the Cozumel municipality, north of the Mexican state of Quintana Roo, within the private property of the former Calica company (Calizas Industriales del Carmen). It was first documented in 1952 by explorer Loring Hewen. In 1987, the Calica Company acquired a large tract of land for a limestone extraction quarry, which included the Rancho Ina archaeological site. During that same year, the first archaeological explorations and descriptions of the structures were made.

=== Casa Azul ===
The Casa Azul (Blue House) of Rancho Ina is an East Coast of Quintana Roo-style shrine that preserves on its facade a large amount of mural painting with which it was originally decorated, standing out for its ancient Maya blue color. It is located inside the Temple of the Columns or Structure P-1, a large building with a flat roof whose entrances were delimited by columns. According to archaeological studies based on ceramic findings, its construction is dated between 1300 and 1450 AD. Numerous Remains of incense burners have been found, which show strong ceremonial activity in the structure. At the top, the Blue House contains a fresco-painted frieze in various shades of blue, white, grey and ochre with black outlines. The Blue House gives a glimpse into the original appearance of the buildings and temples on the East Coast of Quintana Roo. Although Maya structures from the Late Postclassic period in the region were smaller than those of previous periods, they were decorated with finely painted murals depicting mythological scenes.
