= Maya pilgrimage =

Pilgrimage is the travel from one's home to a sacred place of importance within one's faith. The journey itself holds a spiritual significance for the traveler because by participating in this ritual, they renew their faith and/or try to bring about a practical result. In the Maya faith, the believers may make a pilgrimage at any time of the year and to multiple places. Pilgrimages create networks that connect people and places over long distances, so as to transcend the limits of the local community as well as time. Maya pilgrimage displays many specific attributes unique to their culture even though they have been heavily influenced by the Catholic faith since the 15th century. In spite of that, they continue to make their pilgrimage to local shrine sites which are distinctly Maya. These ancient sites are used to communicate to deities or spirits and may be used to appeal to them for help. Though the images on these shrines may now represent Christian saints, aspects of the ancient Maya tradition still exists. The following will describe the fundamentals and purpose of Maya pilgrimage as well as the influence Christianity had on it.

== Ritual location ==
To understand pilgrimage we must explore the locations where the Maya traveled. The natural places that attracted importance in Mesoamerican cultures were mountains, cliffs, boulders, caves, ruins, bodies of water, and islands. These places were usually isolated and remote so the Maya made journeys to visit them. Around 1500, Chichen Itza used to attract pilgrims from all the surrounding kingdoms to its large cenote; other pilgrims visited local shrines, such as those of Ix Chel and other goddesses on the islands off Yucatán's east coast. The Maya usually made shrines at these locations because they believed that the geographical significance created an easier place to communicate with spirits. Each location had one deity associated with it though the Maya could pray to any god they needed. For example, the "gremio" pilgrimage is held annually before each year's rainy season to appeal to the gods for a good season. Each day is dedicated to a different rain god and a different world direction. These ritual locales were identified archaeologically by finding the usual trappings associated with ritual. These included terraces, platforms, shrines, altars, incense, offerings, burials, and rock art. These items were created by the pilgrims to try to communicate with or to appease the gods or spirits in the area. Along with these certain geographical features, the site of the shrine often was a sacred place in which an apparition has appeared, inanimate objects were seen to have come to life, or a miracle has occurred. Nowadays, pilgrimages often involve reciprocal visits of the village saints (as represented by their statues), but also visits to farther-removed sanctuaries, as exemplified by the Q'eqchi' pilgrimages to their thirteen sacred mountains.

== Reasons for pilgrimage ==
The purpose of these travels may be common place or they may have much spiritual meaning to the traveler. To the Maya, pilgrimage is a part of everyday life because they may make the journey to a sacred site for a commonplace reason. They can ask the deity to heal a sick family member, to have a good harvest that year, or they can ask for rain. Whatever the reason, the Maya can and will travel to these remote locations to appeal to the gods for assistance. And by making the right offering, the Maya may expect what they prayed for.

== How to make the pilgrimage ==
To travel, one only needs the funds and a need to talk to the spirits. Usually, the strongest in the village make the journey, but all ages and different socioeconomic statuses are welcome to. Previously, the Maya would only walk to each site but nowadays, there is often transportation provided though some still opt for the traditional walk along ancient Maya roads. If one cannot make the trip, they can also donate money, food, or other goods to actual participants, thus making the pilgrimage in spirit. In this way, they can expect to have their name read in front of the shrine. Sometimes, if it is a movable object, the object of veneration may be taken on a journey to other shrine sites so more pilgrims have access to it.

== Outcome ==
By making these pilgrimages, the participants gain several things. They gain the solidarity and bond among their village by going through this journey together. This creates solidarity between different villages because by making this expedition they gain an understanding among each other. The pilgrimage also creates lasting friendships through the generations because people of all ages are welcome to attend. Those who undertake the pilgrimage gain prestige and respect too. By participating in this ritual, they gain the acceptance and pride of their village.

Another outcome from pilgrimages, though less expected, is the spread of ideas. Patel argues that pilgrimage was the reason for the spread of the Quetzalcoatl or feathered serpent cult all about Mesoamerica. And through the spread of this cult, the cult in turn also spread the Mixteca-Puebla art style. This art style, also known as International style, was used at a number of shrine sites and seemed to increase communication with foreign pilgrims more because there was less emphasis on text and more on common symbols which could be understood by all. By meeting at these pilgrimages or shrine sites, the travelers would meet and exchange ideas and sometimes even goods. By this exchange, the ideas and goods could travel long distances without the need for one person to facilitate the spread.

== Changing pilgrimage ==
After the Spanish conquest, these pilgrimages changed somewhat to incorporate Catholic celebrations and saints. Of course, some of the pilgrimages stayed devoted to their traditional Maya gods so Catholic priests could not be present because it was deemed heretical by the Catholic Church. This combination of Christian and Maya beliefs left scholars divided over whether the Maya could truly be considered Christians. Though they adhere to the classic forms of Christianity, like prayers, mass, worship of saints, and celebration of events on the Christian calendar, the Maya celebrate much like their ancestors did through dance, pilgrimages, and other pre-conquest rituals. Although the Maya have not always been Christian, they have used the cross since before the Spanish conquest. One such pilgrimage to the village of Xocén in Yucatán is centered around a large carved stone cross. The local Maya have inhabited this area since before the arrival of the Spanish and several 16th-century Maya documents have written accords about the pilgrimage to this site. This cross is found to be placed at the end of an ancient Maya road that linked several of the ancient Maya Postclassic cities. Also interesting is that these cities were all at or near major sites of rebellion against the Spanish. Another site of pre-conquest crosses lies at Chumpon, where there is a myth that crosses appeared on trees of mahogany and spoke to the Maya. It was said that these crosses protected the Maya and helped them struggle against their enemy. This tradition of the cross symbol, though developed separately in the Maya and Christian societies, continues to link the two traditions together.
