= Yamil Lu'um =

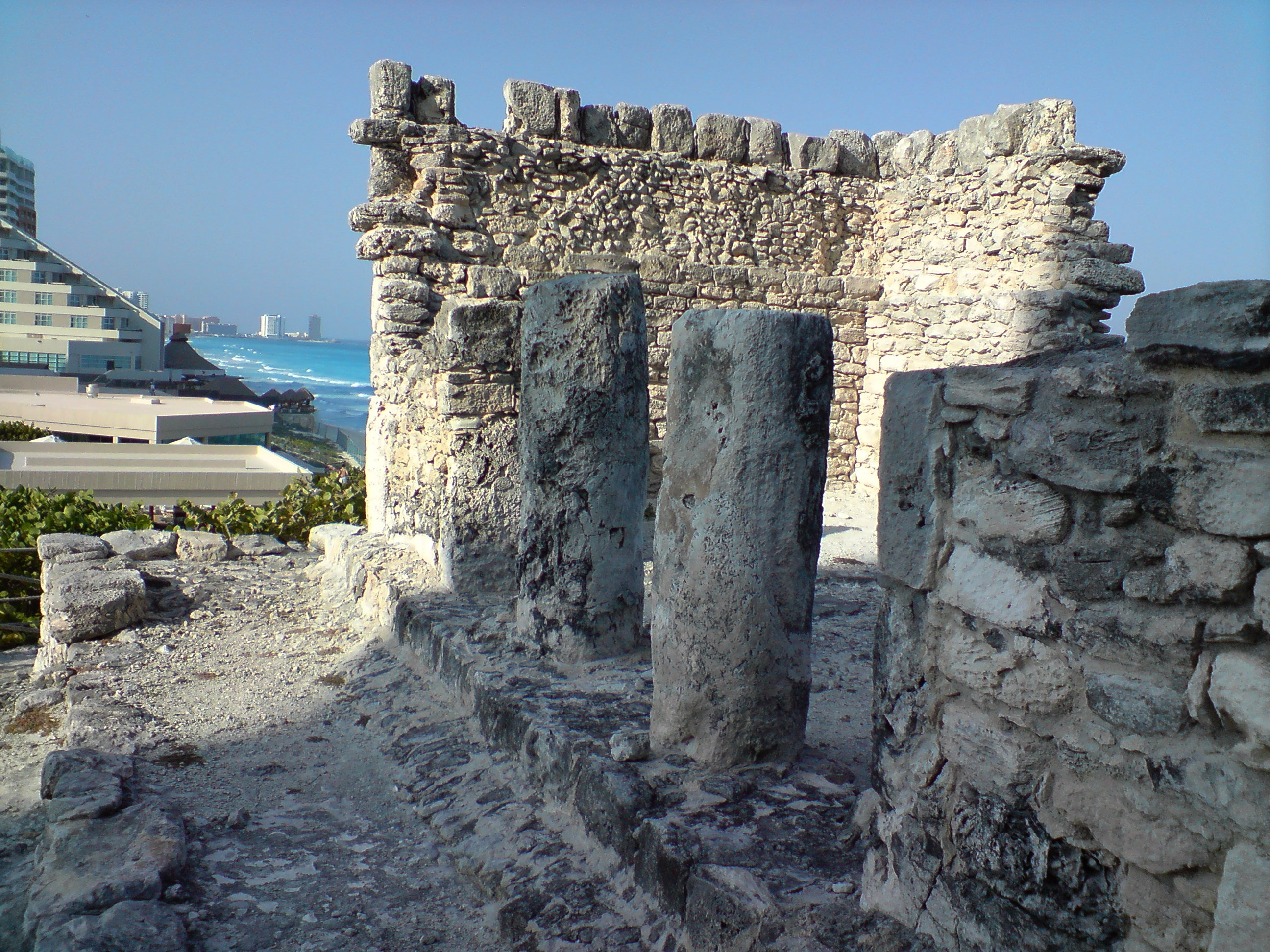
- Scorpion's Temple

- Location within Mexico Location within Quintana Roo
- 21°06′37″N 86°45′37″W
- Type: Ancient Maya site
- Periods: Postclassic
- Cultures: Maya civilization
- Location: Mexico
- Region: East Coast of Quintana Roo

History
- Built: 1200 - 1550
- Abandoned: 1550

Site notes
- Architectural style: East Coast of Quintana Roo

Yamil Lu'um is a Maya archaeological site located on the beach coast of Cancún in the state of Quintana Roo, Mexico. Yamil Lu'um is part of the Maya region of the East Coast of Quintana Roo, Its development occurred during the late postclassic period of the Maya civilization, the main structure is a ceremonial shrine known as the Scorpion's Temple (Templo del Alacrán), This temple is believed to have also served as a Pre-Columbian lighthouse in the beach facing the ocean. Today, the Yamil Lu'um archaeological site is located inside the Cancún Hotel Zone.

== Architecture ==
Yamil Lu'umil is located on a beach rock cliff considered the highest natural point on the coast of Cancún, the site dates from the late postclassic period and was built around the years 1200 to 1550 AD. The Scorpion's Temple is the main building of the site. It is a ceremonial shrine named after a scorpion sculpture found inside.

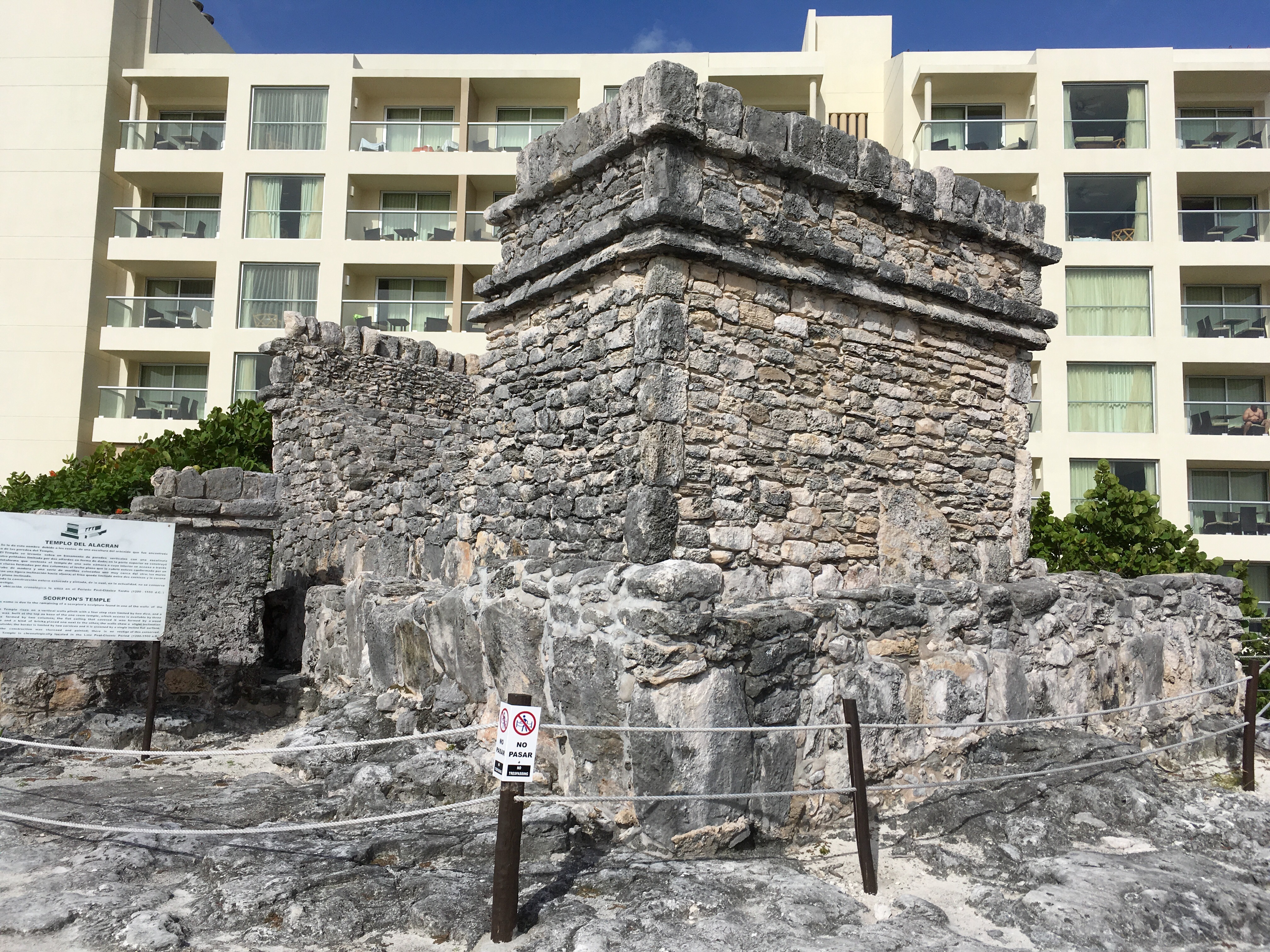
Scorpion's Temple in the Cancun hotel zone
