= El Rey =

El Rey, Spanish for The King, may refer to:

== Locations ==
- El Rey Inn, Santa Fe, New Mexico
- El Rey National Park in Argentina
- El Rey archaeological site, a Mayan site in Cancun, Mexico
- El Rey Theatre (disambiguation)

== Companies ==
- El Rey Chocolates, a Venezuelan chocolatier established in 1927
- El Rey Network, an English language cable network for the Latino market that launched in 2013

== Music ==
- Tito Puente (1923–2000), American musician, songwriter and record producer nicknamed "El Rey"
  - El Rey (Tito Puente album), a 1984 album by Tito Puente on Concord Picante
  - El Rey (The King), a 1968 album by Tito Puente
  - El Rey: Bravo, a 1963 album by Tito Puente
- "El Rey" (song), a Mexican song by José Alfredo Jiménez
- Don Omar (born 1978), Puerto Rican reggaeton singer nicknamed "El Rey"
- El Rey (The Wedding Present album), a 2008 album by The Wedding Present
- El Rey, a 1990 album by Pete "El Conde" Rodríguez

== Other uses ==
- El Rey (film), a 2004 Colombian film directed by Antonio Dorado

== See also ==
- Elrey Borge Jeppesen (1907–1996), American aviation pioneer
