= Cancún =

City in Quintana Roo, Mexico

- City
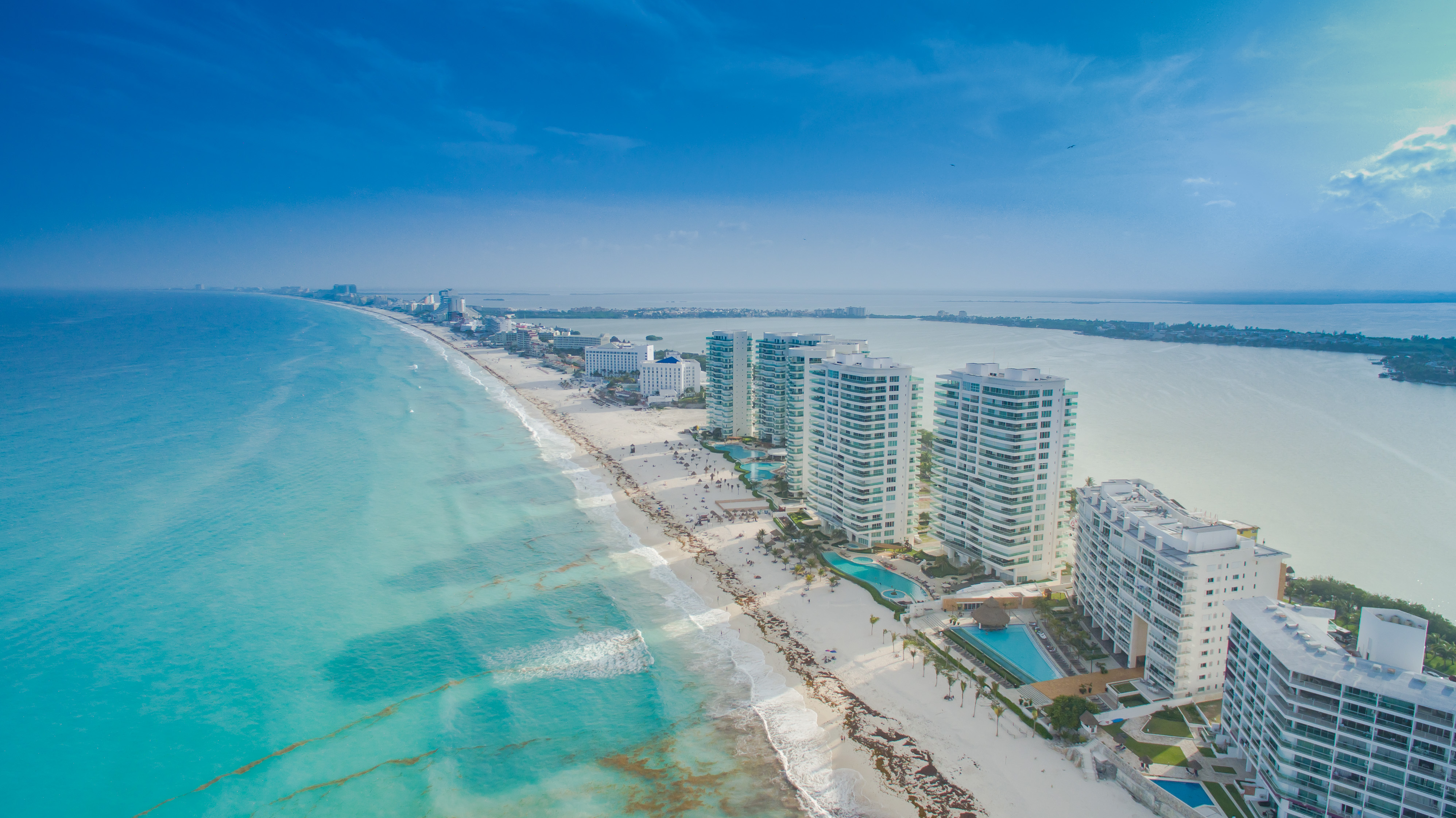
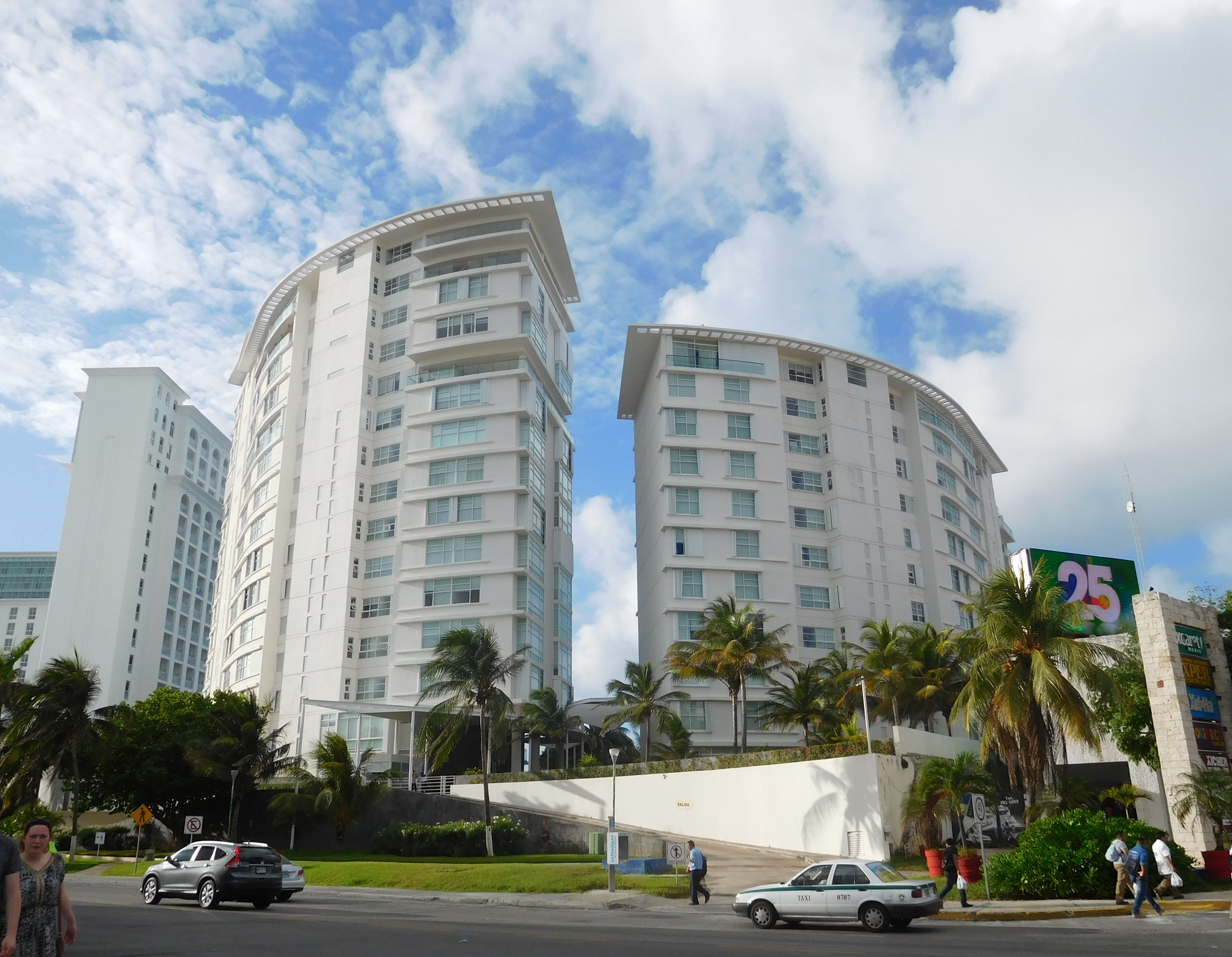
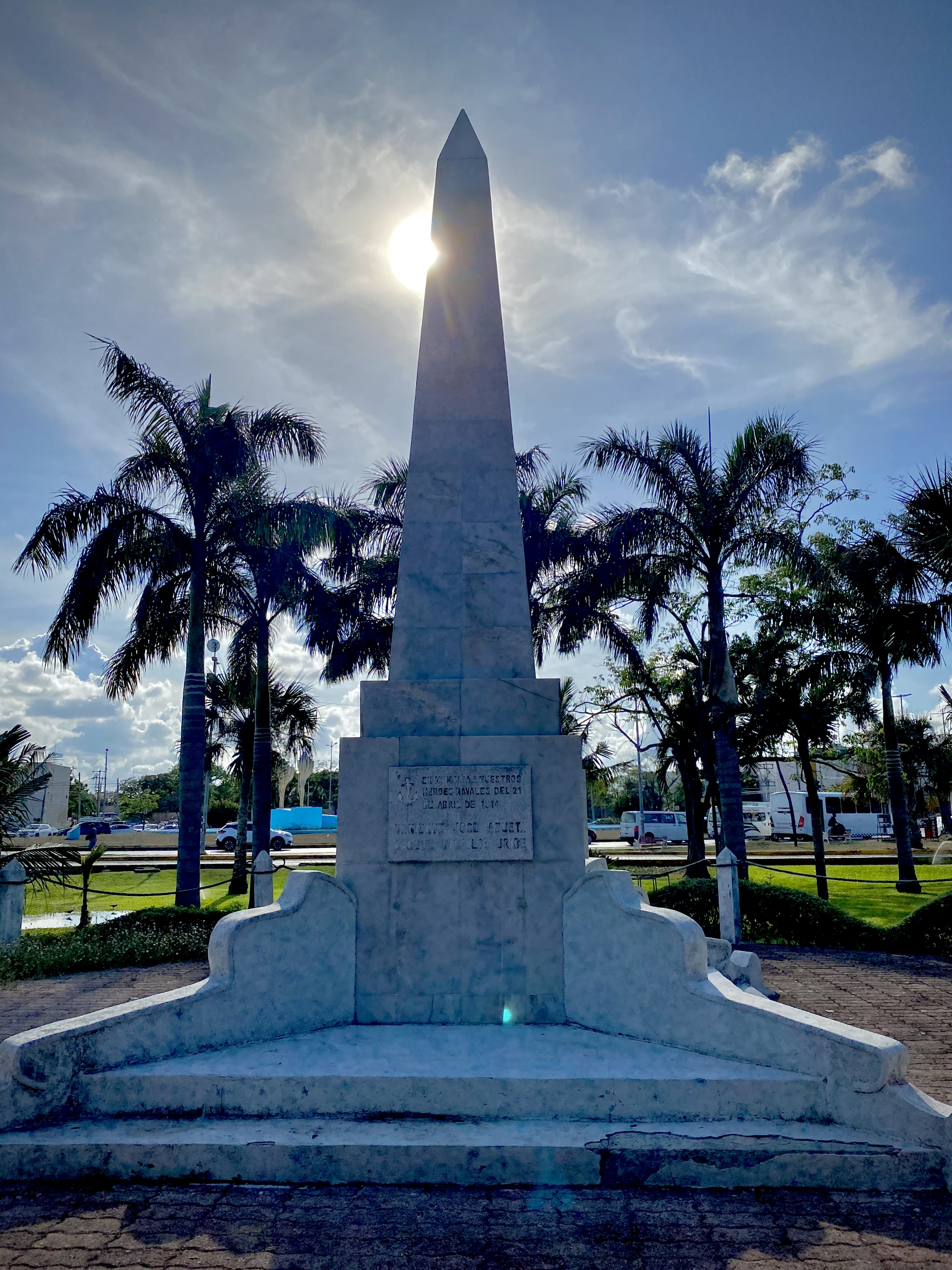
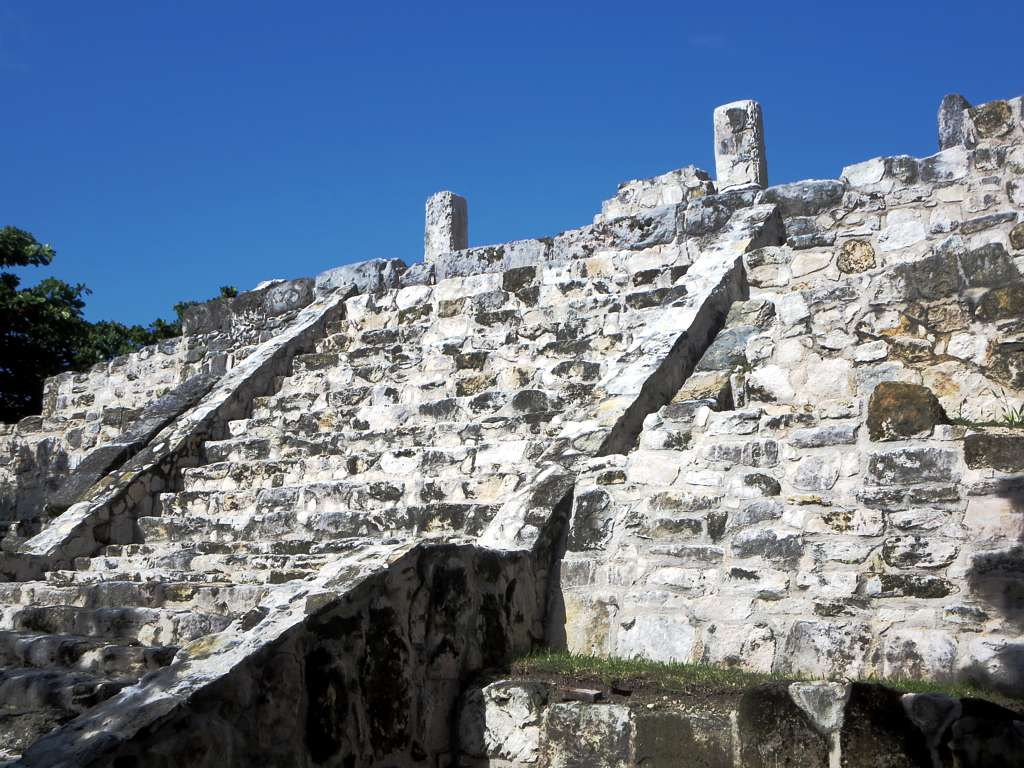
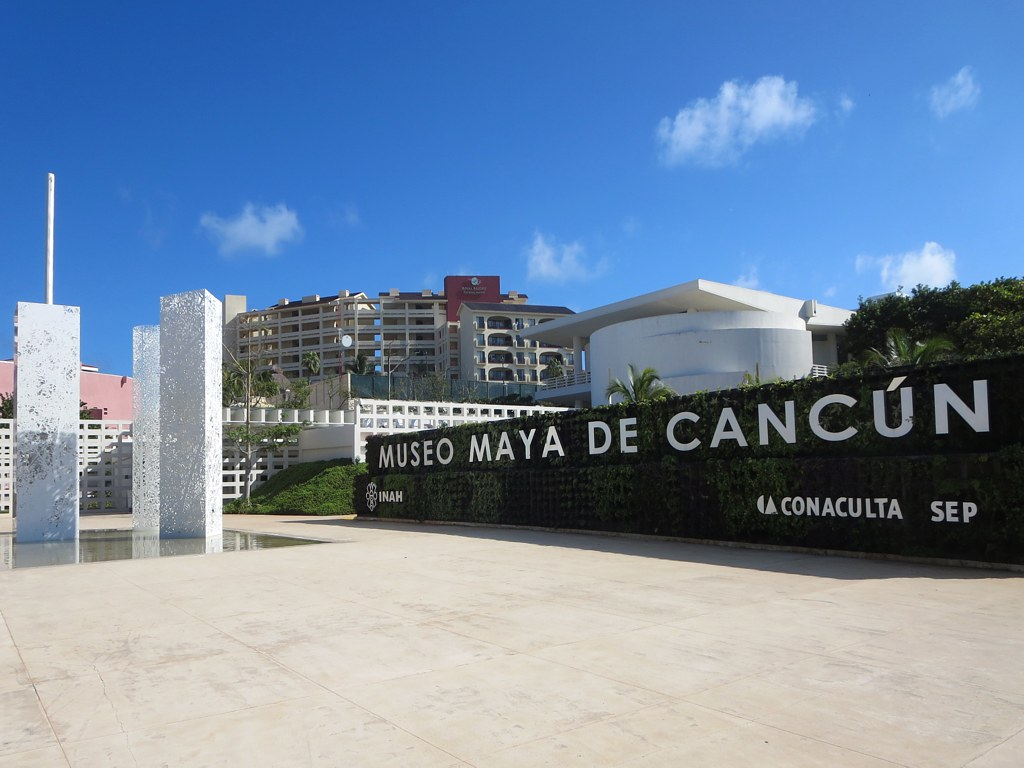
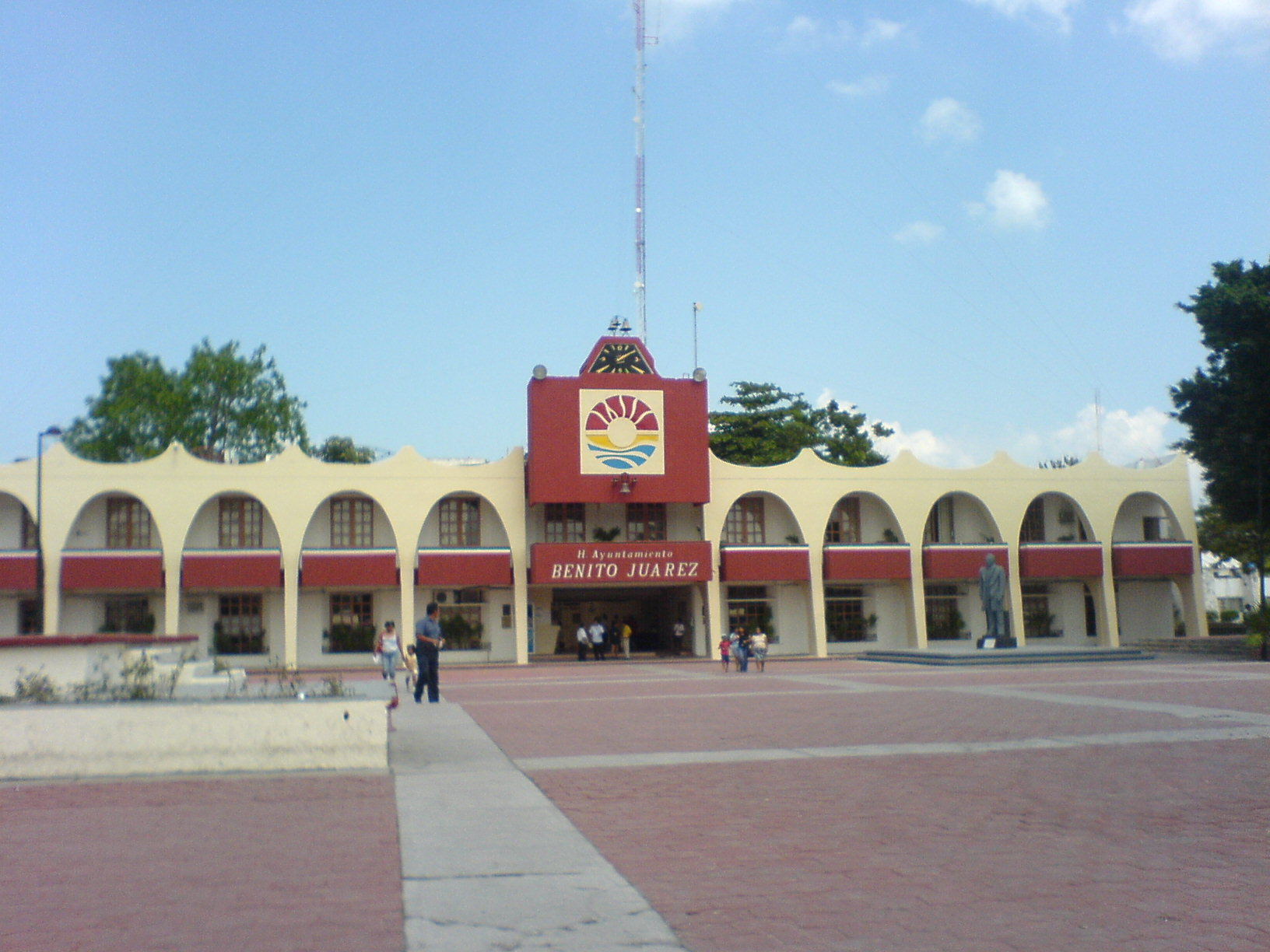
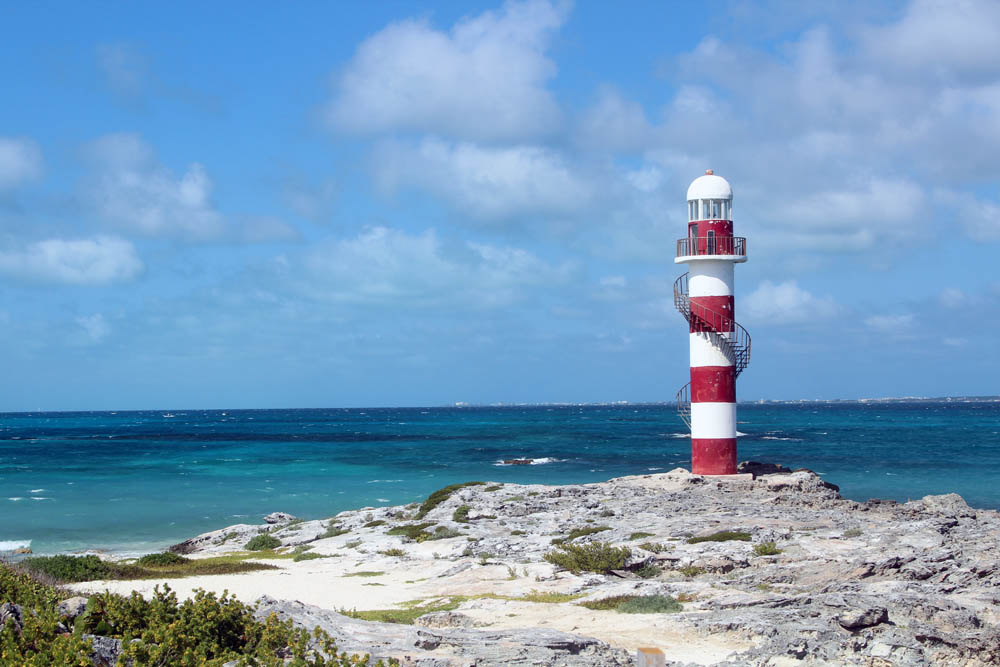
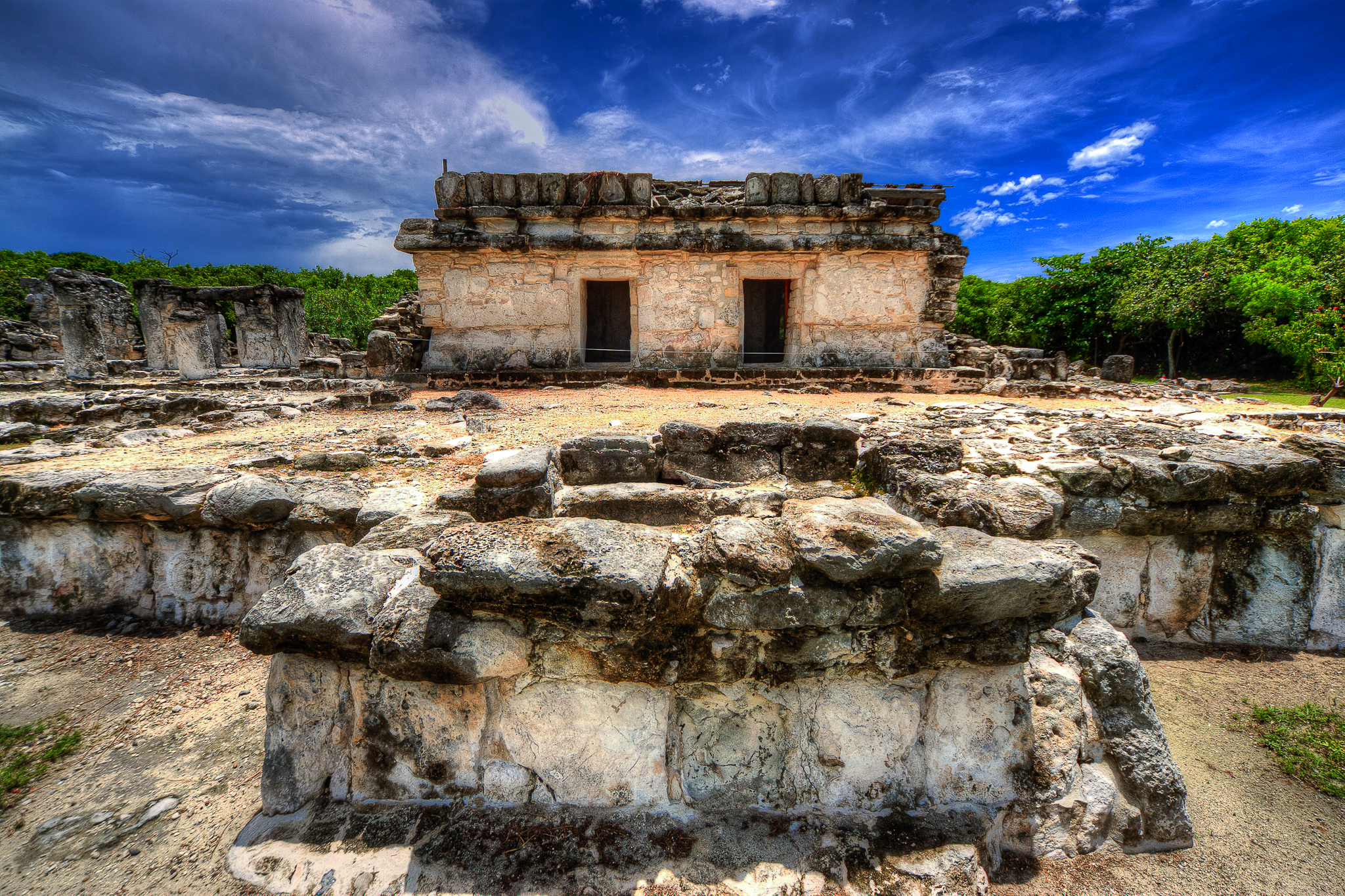
- Hotel Zone Kukulcan Boulevard Memorial obelisk San Miguelito ruins Mayan Museum of Cancún Municipal Palace Lighthouse El Rey archaeological site

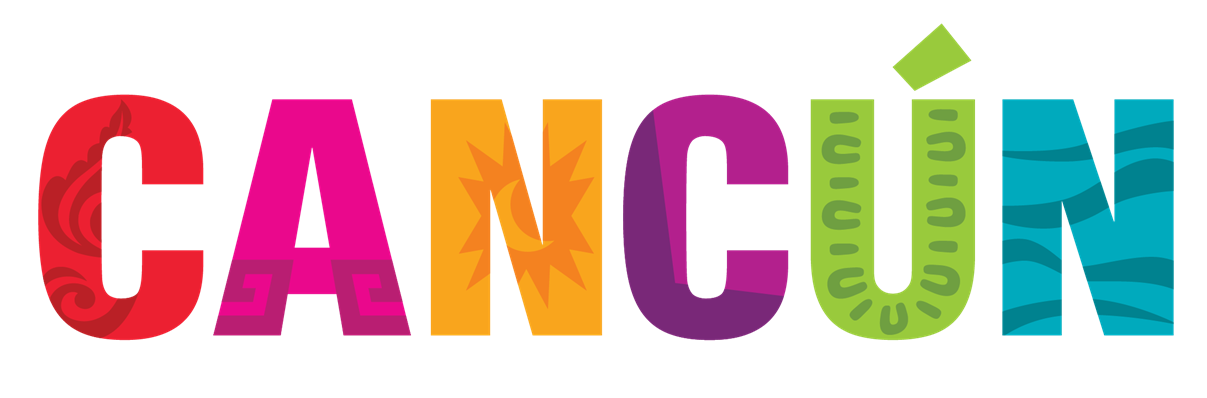
- Logo

- Location in Mexico Cancún (Mexico)
- Coordinates: 21°09′38″N 86°50′51″W
- Country: Mexico
- State: Quintana Roo
- Municipality: Benito Juárez
- Founded: 20 April 1970

Government
  - Mayor: Ana Patricia Peralta de la Peña (MORENA)

Area
  - Land: 142.7 km^{2} (55.1 sq mi)
- Elevation: 10 m (33 ft)
- Highest elevation: 10 m (33 ft)
- Lowest elevation: 0 m (0 ft)

Population (2020)
  - City: 888,797
  - Rank: 14th in Mexico; 1st in Quintana Roo
  - Density: 6,228/km^{2} (16,130/sq mi)
  - Metro: 1,045,005
- Demonym: Cancúnense

GDP
  - Metro: US$9.9 billion (2023)
  - Per capita: US$9,600 (2023)
- Time zone: UTC−05:00 (Zona Sureste)
- Postal code: 77500
- Area code: +52 998
- Website: www.cancun.gob.mx

Cancún (Note: /kænˈkuːn/ kan-KOON; US also /kɑːnˈkuːn/ kahn-KOON, Spanish: [kaŋˈkun]) is the most populous city in the state of Quintana Roo, located in southeast Mexico, on the northeast coast of the Yucatán Peninsula. It is a significant tourist destination in Mexico and the seat of the municipality of Benito Juárez. The city is situated on the Caribbean Sea and is one of Mexico's easternmost points. Cancún is located just north of Mexico's Caribbean coast resort area known as the Riviera Maya. It encompasses the Hotel Zone, which is the main area for tourism.

== Etymology and coat of arms ==
According to early Spanish sources, the island of Cancún was originally known to its Maya inhabitants as Nizuc (Yucatec Maya: niʔ suʔuk), meaning either 'promontory' or 'point of grass'.

The name Cancún, Cancum or Cankun first appears on 18th-century maps. In older English-language documents, the city's name is sometimes spelled Cancoon, an attempt to convey the sound of the name.

Cancún is derived from the Mayan name kàan kun, composed of kàan 'snake' and the verb kum ~ kun 'to swell, overfill'. Two translations have been suggested: the first is 'nest of snakes' and the second, less accepted one is 'place of the golden snake'. Snake iconography was prevalent at the pre-Columbian site of Nizuc.

The shield of the municipality of Benito Juárez, which represents the city of Cancún, was designed by the Mexican-American artist Joe Vera. It is divided into three parts: the color blue symbolizes the Caribbean Sea, the yellow the sand, and the red the sun with its rays.

== History ==
Historical population
Year	Pop.	±%
1990	167,730	—
1995	297,183	+77.2%
2000	397,191	+33.7%
2005	526,701	+32.6%
2010	628,306	+19.3%
2015	743,626	+18.4%
2020	888,797	+19.5%

In the years after the Spanish conquest of Yucatán, much of the Maya population died or left as a result of disease, warfare, and famines, leaving only small settlements on Isla Mujeres and Cozumel Island.

Cancún is a planned city, created to foster tourism. When development of the area as a resort was started on 23 January 1970, Isla Cancún had only three residents, all caretakers of the coconut plantation of Don José de Jesús Lima Gutiérrez, who lived on Isla Mujeres. Some 117 people lived in nearby Puerto Juárez, a fishing village and military base. Cancún was created as a government project to boost tourism. In 1967, the Mexican government allocated a 2 million-dollar fund to be administered by the Bank of Mexico to determine the feasibility of creating new recreational zones, "preferably where no other viable development alternatives exist." This was entrusted to INFRATUR, a Bank of Mexico agency.

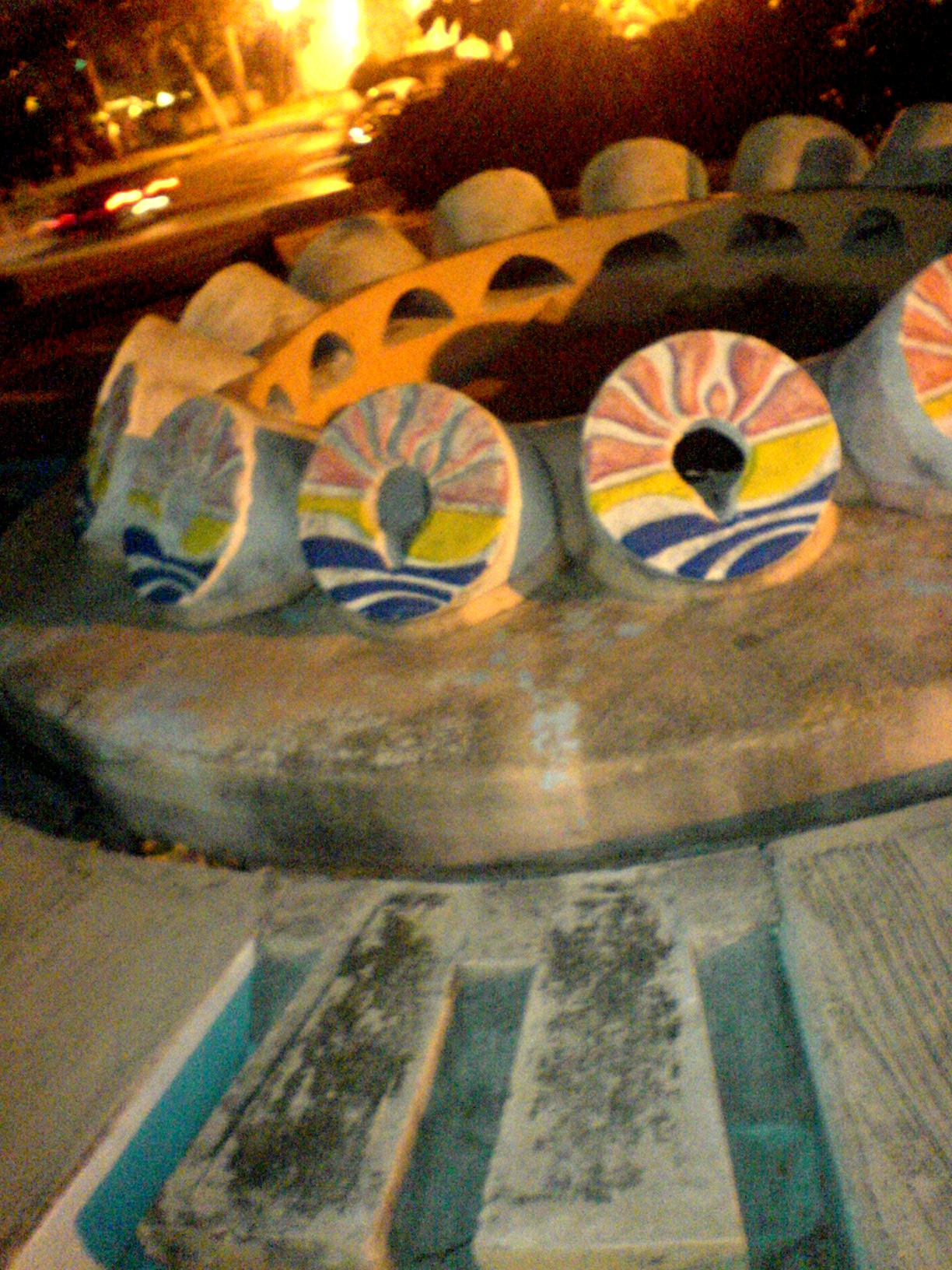
A fountain allusive to Benito Juárez's coat of arms, in Cobá and Náder Avenues

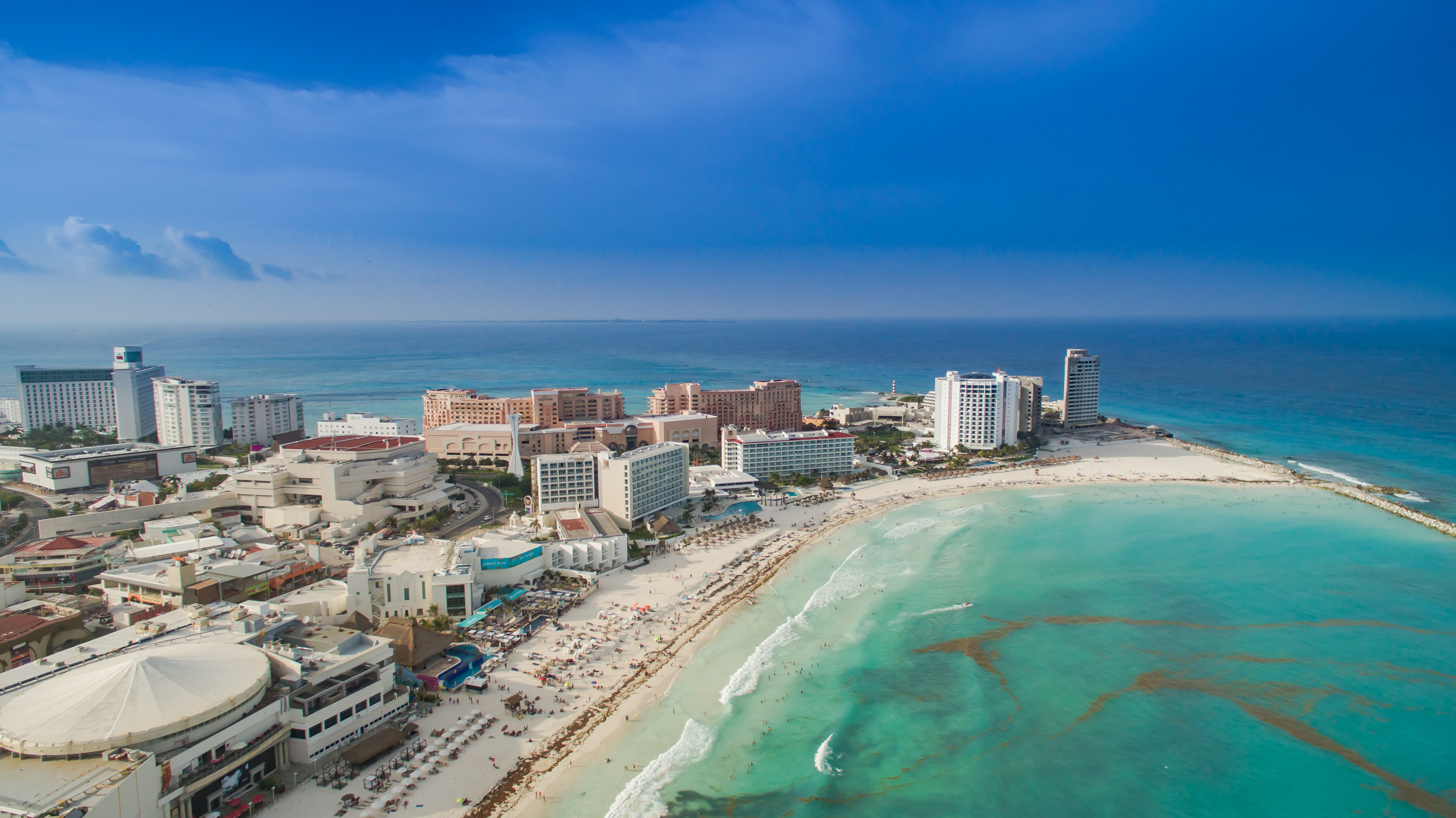
Aerial photograph of Cancún

Due to the reluctance of investors to gamble on an unknown area, the Mexican federal government financed the first nine hotels.

The city began as a tourism project in 1974 as an Integrally Planned Center, a pioneer of FONATUR (Fondo Nacional de Fomento al Turismo, National Fund for Tourism Development), formerly known as INFRATUR. Since then, it has undergone a comprehensive transformation from a fisherman's island to being one of the two most well-known Mexican resorts, along with Acapulco. The growth of Cancún outpaced the rest of Quintana Roo during the late 20th century. From 1970 to 1980, the population grew by 62.3% annually on average. The development of Cancún as a tourist city exceeded the expectations of Mexican state planners. The growth of Cancún was part of a wider touristification of northern Quintana Roo, in contrast to the south and east of the state, which experienced greater development in the timber industry. From the 1990s onward, the tourism industry expanded from places like Cancún into indigenous territories and protected areas in inland sites.

Most 'Cancunenses' are from Yucatán and other Mexican states. A growing number are from the rest of the Americas and Europe. The municipal authorities have struggled to provide public services for the constant influx of people, while limiting squatters and irregular developments, which in 2006 occupied an estimated ten to fifteen percent of the mainland area on the fringes of the city.

In 2023, a record 21 million tourists visited Cancún, topping the original estimate of 20.5 million.

=== Public safety concerns ===
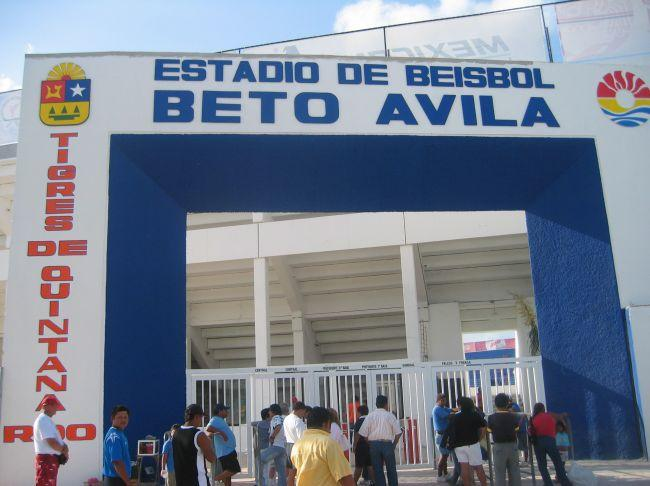
Estadio de Béisbol Beto Ávila, home of Tigres de Quintana Roo

In the 21st century, Cancún has largely avoided the violence associated with the trade of illegal drugs; however, drugs are sold to tourists in bars and nightclubs. Cancún has gradually been reported for being a center of money laundering. The links with Cancún date from the 1990s and early 2000s, when the area was controlled by the Juárez and Gulf drug cartels. By 2010, Los Zetas, a group that broke away from the Gulf Cartel, had taken control of many smuggling routes through the Yucatán, according to the U.S. Drug Enforcement Administration.

There have been a number of violent acts in the city related to drug trafficking. Between 2013 and 2016, there were 76 murders: 31 in 2016, and at least 193 in 2017, the vast majority related to drug trafficking. Most have occurred in the urban nucleus, and there have been various violent episodes with firearms in the so-called "Zona Hotelera". Beginning in 2018 with a high wave of violence, Cancún is above the national average in homicides. In January 2018 alone, there were 33 homicides, triple the number from January 2017.

=== Sargassum ===
Starting in 2015, Cancún tourism was significantly impacted by the appearance of large amounts of smelly, unsightly brown Sargassum seaweed on its white sand beaches every summer. By 2021, Sargassum season had become an annual occurrence at many Caribbean beach destinations, including Cancún.

== Geography ==
=== City layout ===
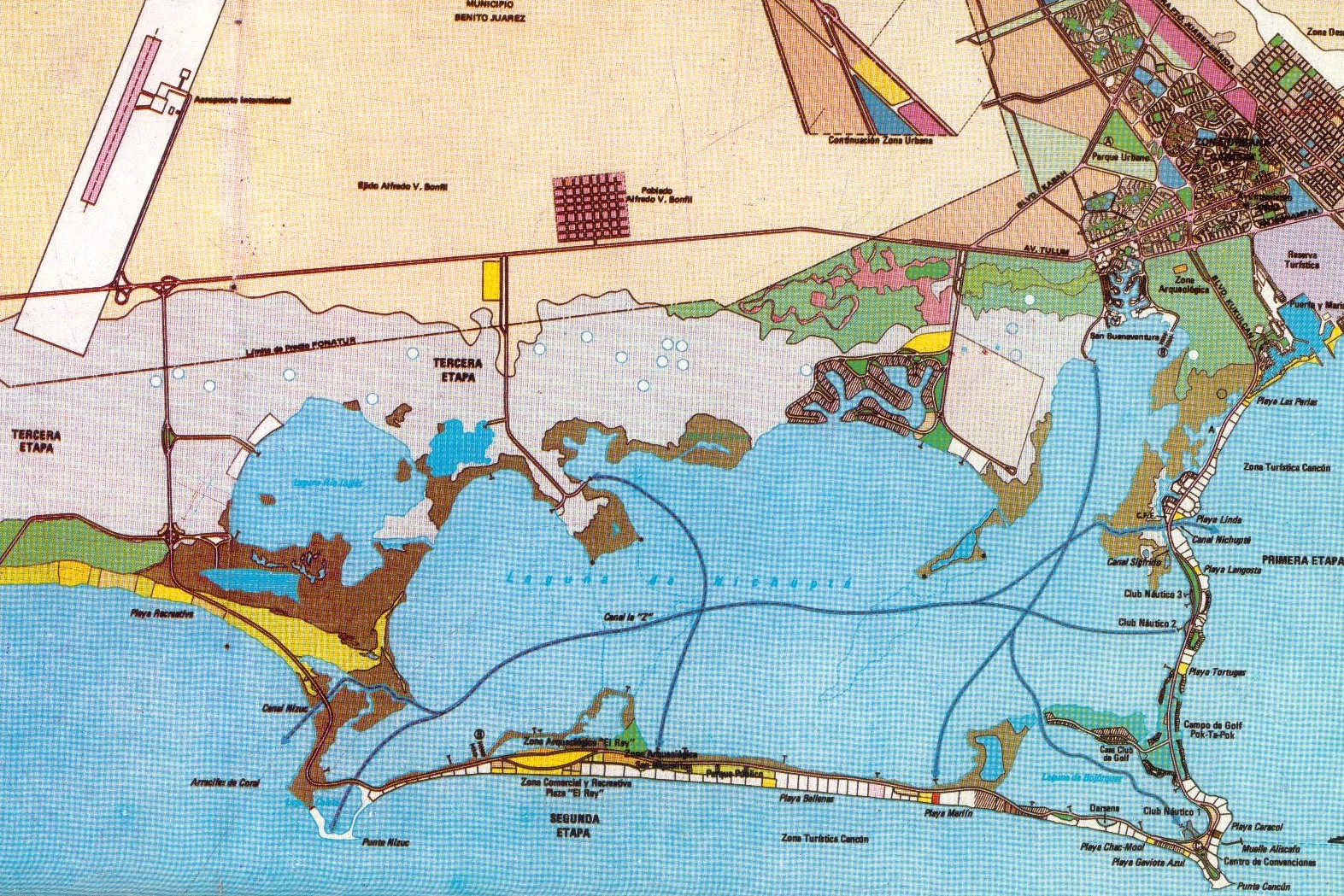
One of Cancún's designs before zoning

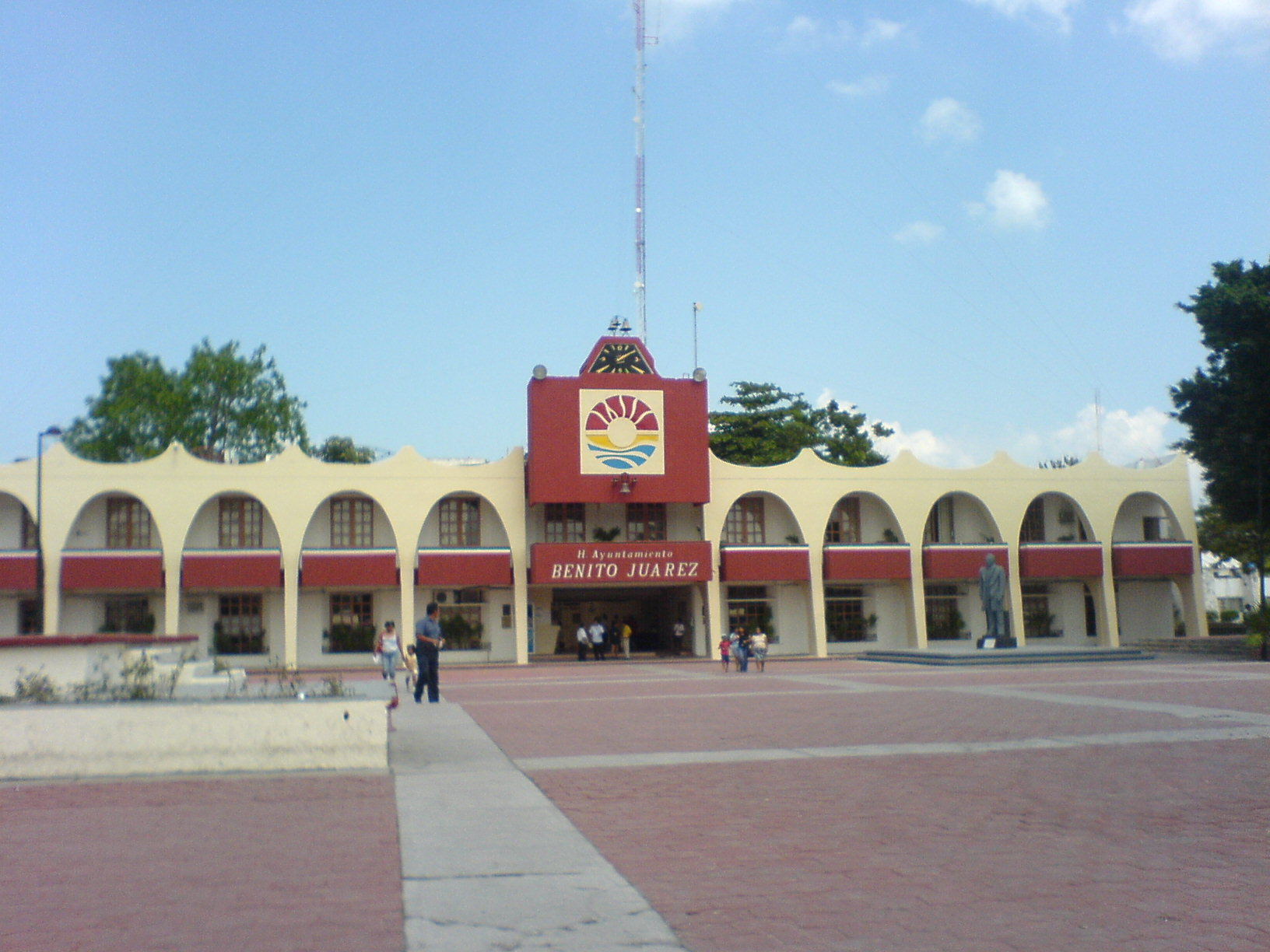
Town Hall

Apart from the island tourist zone (part of the Mesoamerican Barrier Reef System), the Mexican residential section of the city, the downtown part of which is known as "El Centro", follows a master plan that consists of "supermanzanas" (superblocks), giant trapezoids with a central, open, non-residential area cut in by u-shaped residential streets.

Cancún's mainland or downtown area has diverged from the original plan; development is scattered around the city. The remaining undeveloped beach and lagoon front areas outside the Hotel Zone are now under varying stages of development, in Punta Sam and Puerto Juarez to the north, continuing along Bonampak and south toward the airport along Boulevard Donaldo Colosio. One development abutting the Hotel Zone is Puerto Cancún; Malecon Cancún is another large development.

=== Climate ===
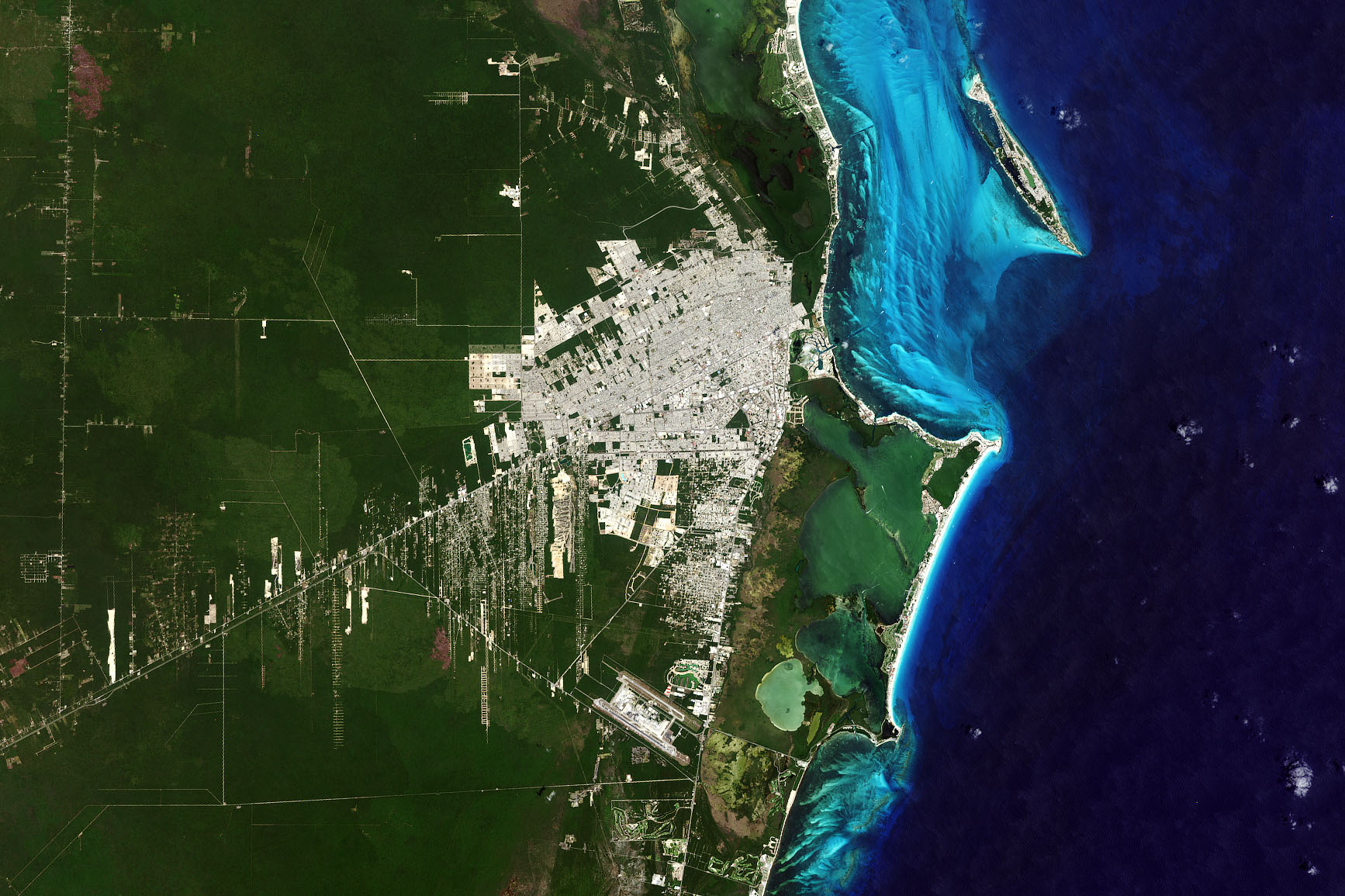
Satellite picture of Cancún

Cancún has a tropical climate, specifically a tropical wet and dry climate (Köppen Aw), with little temperature difference between months, but pronounced rainy and dry seasons. The city is hot year-round, and moderated by onshore trade winds, with an annual mean temperature of 27.1 °C (80.8 °F). Unlike inland areas of the Yucatán Peninsula, sea breezes restrict high temperatures from reaching 36 °C (97 °F) on most afternoons. Annual rainfall is around 1,340 millimeters (52.8 in), falling on 115 days per year.

The rainy season runs from late August through November, and the dry season runs from November through April. The hurricane season runs from June through November. The Hotel Zone juts into the Caribbean Sea and is therefore surrounded by ocean, keeping daytime temperatures around 1 to 2 °C (1.8 to 3.6 °F) cooler. Windspeeds are higher than at the airport located some distance inland, which is the official meteorological station for Cancún; averages are shown below.

Thanks to the Yucatán current continually bringing warm water from further south, the sea temperature is always very warm, with lows of 79 °F (26 °C) in winter and highs of 84 °F (29 °C) in summer.

Climate data for Cancún (Airport/Observatorio) 1991–2020 normals, extremes 1951–present
Month	Jan	Feb	Mar	Apr	May	Jun	Jul	Aug	Sep	Oct	Nov	Dec	Year
Record high °C (°F)	33 (91)	38 (100)	39 (102)	38 (100)	39 (102)	39 (102)	39 (102)	41.5 (106.7)	38.5 (101.3)	38 (100)	37 (99)	33.5 (92.3)	41.5 (106.7)
Mean daily maximum °C (°F)	28.5 (83.3)	29.3 (84.7)	30.6 (87.1)	32.1 (89.8)	33.3 (91.9)	33.6 (92.5)	34.0 (93.2)	34.2 (93.6)	33.3 (91.9)	31.6 (88.9)	30.1 (86.2)	28.9 (84.0)	31.6 (88.9)
Daily mean °C (°F)	23.9 (75.0)	24.5 (76.1)	25.7 (78.3)	27.3 (81.1)	28.6 (83.5)	29.1 (84.4)	29.3 (84.7)	29.4 (84.9)	28.7 (83.7)	27.4 (81.3)	25.8 (78.4)	24.4 (75.9)	27.0 (80.6)
Mean daily minimum °C (°F)	19.3 (66.7)	19.6 (67.3)	20.8 (69.4)	22.4 (72.3)	23.9 (75.0)	24.6 (76.3)	24.5 (76.1)	24.5 (76.1)	24.1 (75.4)	23.1 (73.6)	21.5 (70.7)	20.0 (68.0)	22.4 (72.3)
Record low °C (°F)	12 (54)	11 (52)	9.5 (49.1)	13 (55)	16 (61)	19 (66)	19 (66)	19 (66)	19 (66)	15 (59)	12 (54)	11 (52)	9.5 (49.1)
Average rainfall mm (inches)	56.4 (2.22)	42.7 (1.68)	45.4 (1.79)	37.1 (1.46)	84.4 (3.32)	145.6 (5.73)	111.4 (4.39)	115.1 (4.53)	223.1 (8.78)	242.1 (9.53)	112.5 (4.43)	79.5 (3.13)	1,295.3 (51.00)
Average rainy days (≥ 0.1 mm)	6.4	4.4	3.9	3.2	5.9	10.3	9.8	9.6	14.3	14.8	8.8	7.7	99.1
Average relative humidity (%)	79	77	76	75	76	79	78	78	81	81	80	79	78
Mean monthly sunshine hours	217.0	223.2	254.2	258.0	266.6	222.0	248.0	244.9	192.0	192.2	201.0	195.3	2,714.4
Source 1: Servicio Meteorológico Nacional (1951–2010)
Source 2: Weather.Directory

Average Sea Temperature
Jan	Feb	Mar	Apr	May	Jun	Jul	Aug	Sep	Oct	Nov	Dec
79 °F 26 °C	79 °F 26 °C	79 °F 26 °C	81 °F 27 °C	82 °F 28 °C	84 °F 29 °C	84 °F 29 °C	84 °F 29 °C	84 °F 29 °C	84 °F 29 °C	82 °F 28 °C	81 °F 27 °C

==== Tropical storms and hurricanes ====
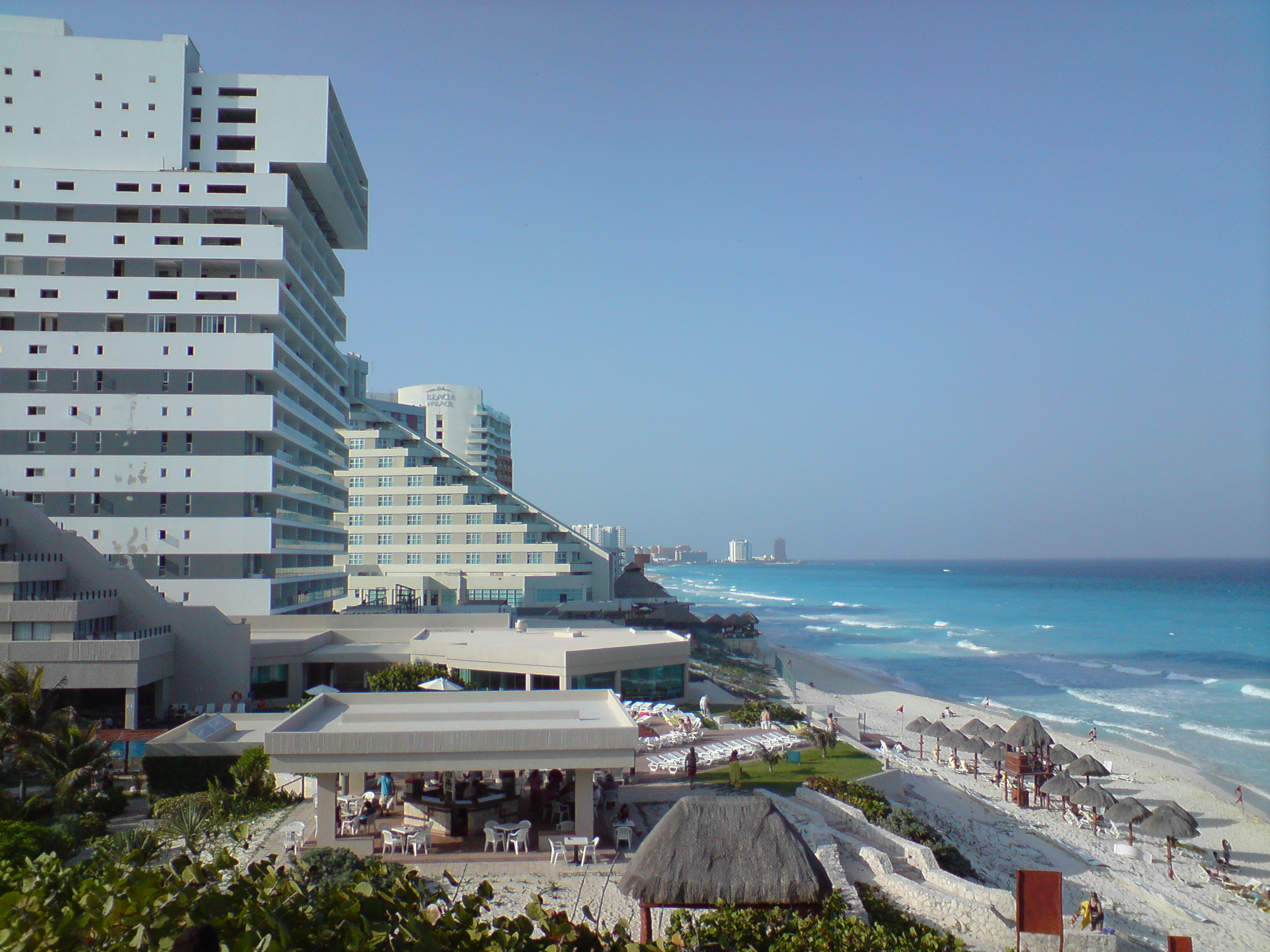
Cancún beaches, km 12

The tropical storm season lasts from May to December, the rainy season extending into January with peak precipitation in October. February to early May tends to be drier with only occasional scattered showers. Cancún is located in one of the main Caribbean hurricane impact areas. Although large hurricanes are rare, they have struck near Cancún in recent years, Hurricane Wilma in 2005 being the largest. Hurricane Gilbert made a devastating direct hit on Cancún in September 1988, and the tourist hotels needed to be rebuilt. In both cases, federal, state, and municipal authorities were well prepared to deal with most of the effects on tourists and residents. Hurricane Dean in 2007 also made its mark on the city of Cancún.

Making landfall in 1988, Hurricane Gilbert was the second most intense hurricane ever observed in the Atlantic basin. It landed on the Yucatán Peninsula after crossing over the island of Cozumel. In the Cancún region, a loss of $87 million (1989 USD) due to a decline in tourism was estimated for the months of October, November, and December in 1988.

On October 21, 2005, Hurricane Wilma made landfall on Mexico's Yucatán Peninsula as a powerful Category 4 hurricane, with strong winds in excess of 150 mph (240 km/h). The hurricane's eye first passed over the island of Cozumel, and then made an official landfall near Playa del Carmen in the state of Quintana Roo at around 11 p.m. local time on October 21 with winds near 140 mph (230 km/h). Portions of the island of Cozumel experienced the calm eye of Wilma for several hours with some blue skies and sunshine visible at times. The eye slowly drifted northward, with the center passing just to the west of Cancún, Quintana Roo.

Two years after Hurricane Wilma, in 2007, Hurricane Dean made landfall as a Category 5 storm in Majahual, 190 miles (310 km) to the south of Cancún. Fierce winds at the edge of Dean's impact cone stripped sand off 7.5 miles (12.1 km) of beaches from Punta Cancún (Camino Real Hotel) to Punta Nizuc (Club Med). The authorities asked tourism operators to suspend sending tourists to Cancún while Hurricane Dean was approaching. Still, they did ask airlines to send empty planes, which were then used to evacuate tourists already there.

== Attractions ==
=== Hospitality ===
The Hotel Zone is the main means of economic income for Cancún and is one of the most visited international tourist destinations in the world.

=== Old Airport Control Tower Memorial ===
Despite being a young city, Cancún has a memorial monument of its foundation on a replica of the old Airport Control Tower that resembles its own date of foundation. The original control tower was a provisional wooden structure, the work of Mexican architects Agustín and Enrique Landa Verdugo.

The old airport was located in the same part of the city that today corresponds to Kabah Avenue. The tower is 15 meters tall, has a 45-step staircase, and has a base dimension of 5 × 5 meters. The memorial was first built in 2002 with a donation by Aerocaribe, a local airline, but the structure was damaged after Hurricane Wilma in 2005. After pleas by the local people to rebuild the tower memorial, a new version was erected in 2010, which was later abandoned without proper maintenance until Woox Pinturas, a local wood maintenance company, made a donation to restore the structure to its original appearance.

=== El Ceviche Fountain ===
The real name of this monument is "Caribbean Fantasy", located in the heart of downtown Cancún, between the Coba and Tulum avenues intersection. It is the nerve center of the daily urban traffic of the city. It has witnessed multiple social and political events, undergoing constant repairs and remodeling for years.

Six years after Quintana Roo was recognized as the youngest state in the Mexican Republic and barely a decade after the city of Cancún was born, on October 22 and 23, 1981, the North-South Summit was held at the now defunct Sheraton Hotel. Two abstract pillars made of metal crossbeams gave the structure a stepped pyramidal appearance, with small masts displaying the flags of the countries attending the 1981 North-South Summit. The author, Lorraine Pinto, added details representing Quetzalcoatl on the sides, resembling the pyramid of Chichen-Itza, located in Yucatán.

In 1994, the municipal authorities of Cancún decided to demolish the commemorative structure because the city had been the scene of one of the most devastating climatic-environmental phenomena in the history of the Yucatán Peninsula, Hurricane Gilberto. The sculpture was irreversibly affected, leaving only the solid concrete base and the metal skeleton.

Due to its crosswise and bare appearance, the locals began to call it "Insectronic", a device manufactured by the Steren company to kill flies and mosquitoes. The municipal authorities decided to keep its base and the dynamics of the water fountain.

Once again, Lorraine Pinto was on call to create what locals began to call the Ceviche Fountain or the Ceviche Roundabout.

=== Mayan archeological sites ===
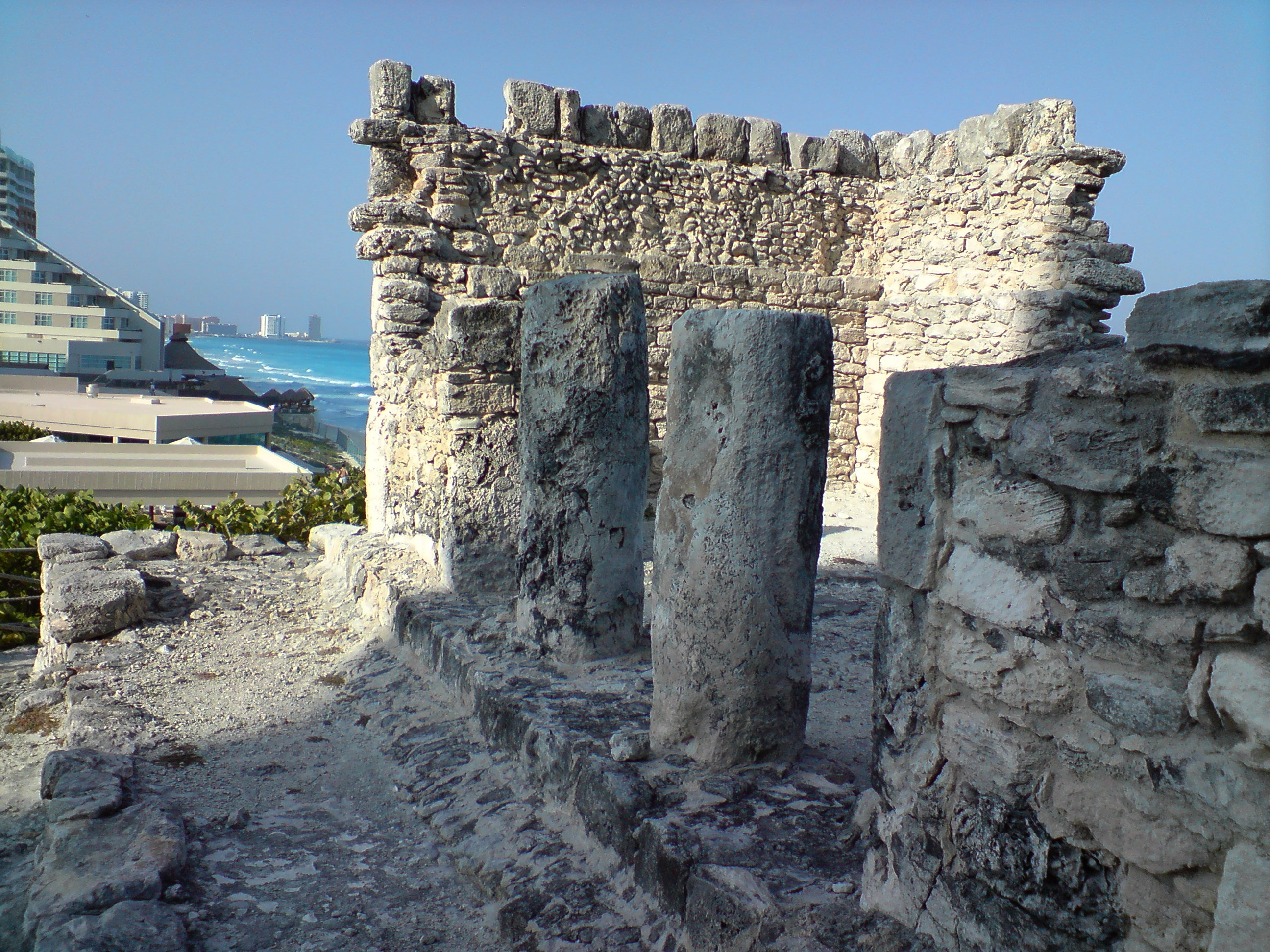
Yamil Lu'um, Temple of the Scorpion

There are some small Mayan vestiges of the pre-Columbian Maya civilization in Cancún. El Rey (Las Ruinas del Rey) is located in the Hotel Zone. El Meco, a more substantial site, is located 2.7 km along the Puerto Juárez–Punta Sam road, north of Cancún.

Close by in the Riviera Maya and the Grand Costa Maya, there are sites such as Cobá and Muyil (Riviera), the small Polé (now Xcaret), and Kohunlich, Kinichná, Dzibanché, Ichkabal Oxtankah, Tulum, Noh Kah, Chacchoben, among others, in the south of the state. Chichén Itzá is in the neighboring state of Yucatán.

== Sports ==
Football club Atlante F.C. was founded in 1916 in Mexico City and moved to Cancún in 2007 due to poor attendance in Mexico City. In June 2020, speculation began about a possible move of Atlante F.C. back Mexico City. On June 26, the relocation became official. The same day, the relocation of Cafetaleros de Chiapas to Cancún was announced, with the team renamed Cancún F.C. They play in the Liga de Expansión MX, the Mexican second division, at the Estadio Andrés Quintana Roo. The city is also home to the Pioneros de Cancún of the Liga Premier de México, the third tier of Mexican football.

The Tiburones de Cancún (Cancún Sharks) were a professional American football team that played in the Fútbol Americano de México (FAM) league until the league's dissolution in 2022.

The city is also home to the baseball team Tigres de Quintana Roo, who play in the Mexican League (LMB).

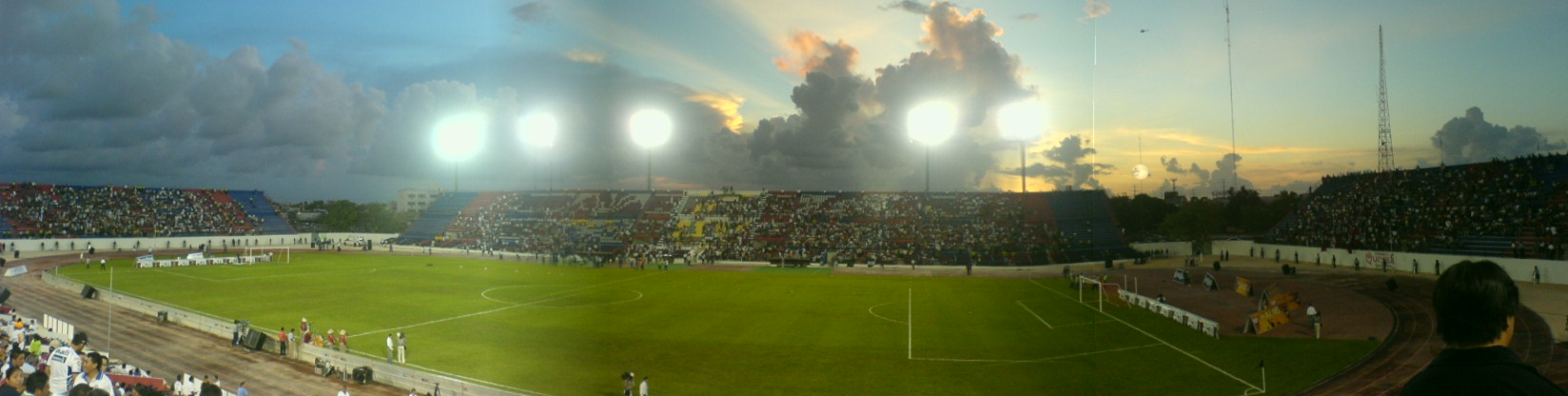
Andrés Quintana Roo Stadium, with a slightly larger capacity than originally planned, for club Atlante F.C.

In October 2023, the WTA Finals (Women's Tennis Association) were held in Cancún, in a temporary, outdoor, hard court stadium in Plaza Quintana Roo with a capacity of 4,300. Aryna Sabalenka and Elena Rybakina criticized the facility, saying that it was unacceptable for high level tennis, not ready in time for practice, and there was no time to fix it.

Since February 2025, the Cancún Country Club Residencial & Golf in Cancún hosts the WTA 125 tennis tournament "Cancún Tennis Open", that takes place on outdoor hardcourts.

Cancún and Mérida co-hosted the 2026 U-15 Baseball World Cup. The Cancún venue was at Estadio Beto Ávila.

== Transportation ==
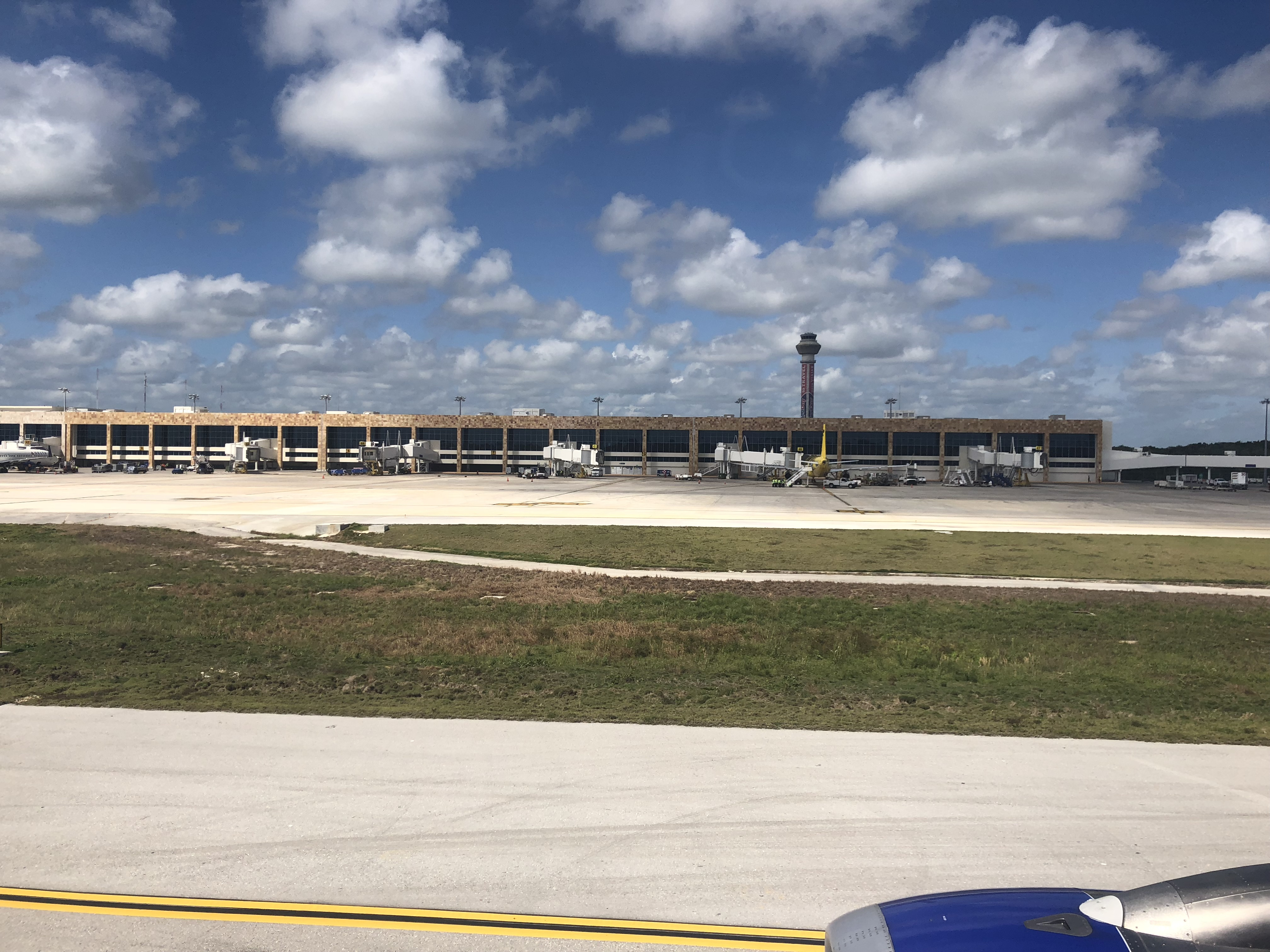
Cancún International Airport

=== Airport ===
Cancún is served by the Cancún International Airport with an added main runway that commenced operation in October 2009. It has many flights to North America, Central America, South America, and Europe. It is located on the northeast of the Yucatán Peninsula, serving an average of about fifteen million passengers per year. The airport is located around 20 km (12 mi) from the Hotel Zone, approximately a 20-minute trip by car.

=== Ferry ===
The island of Isla Mujeres is located off the coast. It is accessible by ferry from Puerto Juárez and from Playa Tortugas in the Hotel Zone. In 2020, the Quintana Roo government implemented a law that all international visitors arriving in the State of Quintana Roo are required to pay a fee called the VisiTAX. Visitors with a Mexican passport are exempted from the tax.

=== Train ===
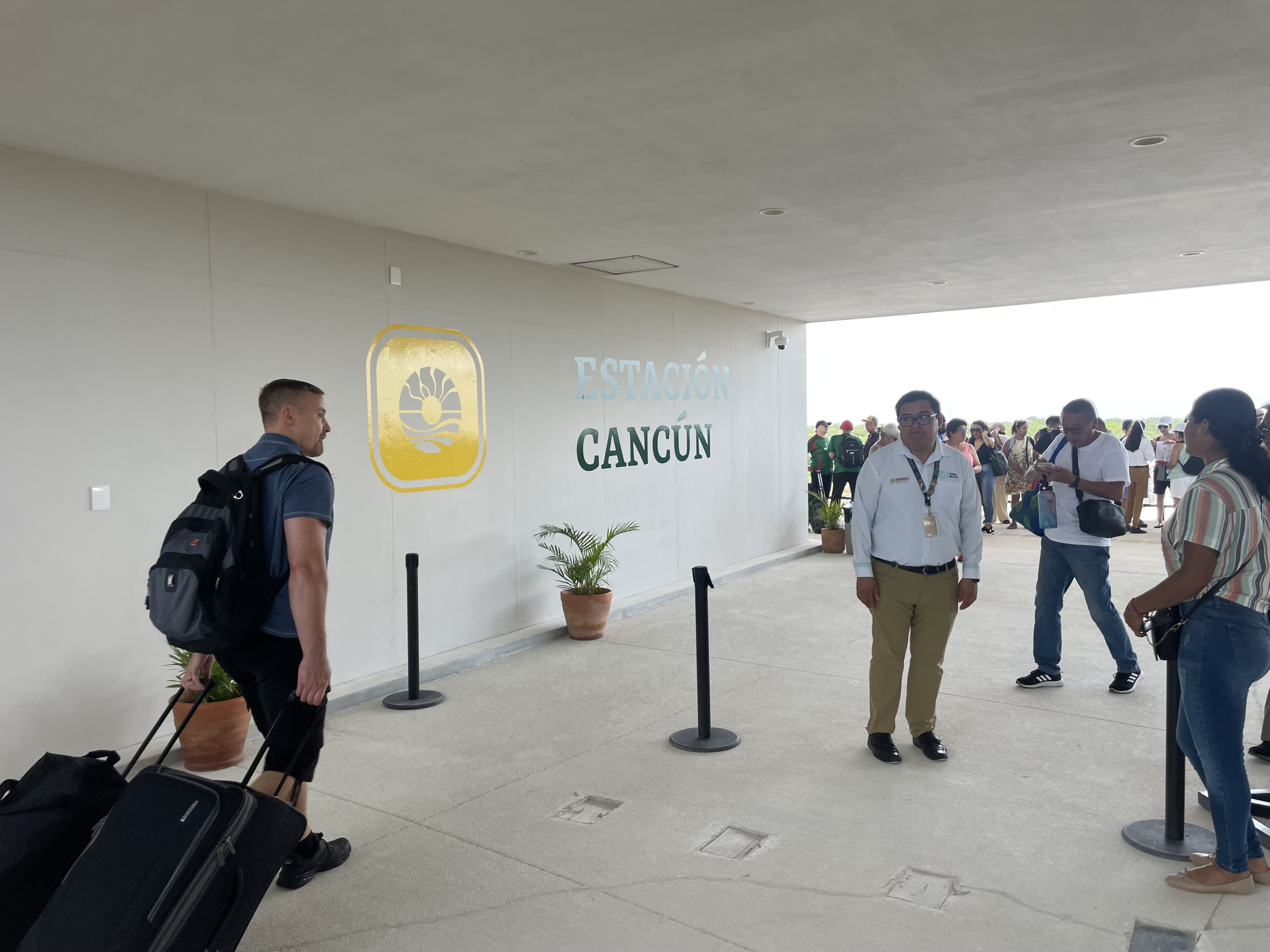
Tren Maya Cancún Airport station

The Tren Maya, under construction since June 2020, will connect Cancún to Palenque, Chiapas with intermediate stops on the Yucatán peninsula and operations started on December 15, 2023. Passengers can take a free electric shuttle from Cancun Airport to the Tren Maya Station.

=== Public transportation ===
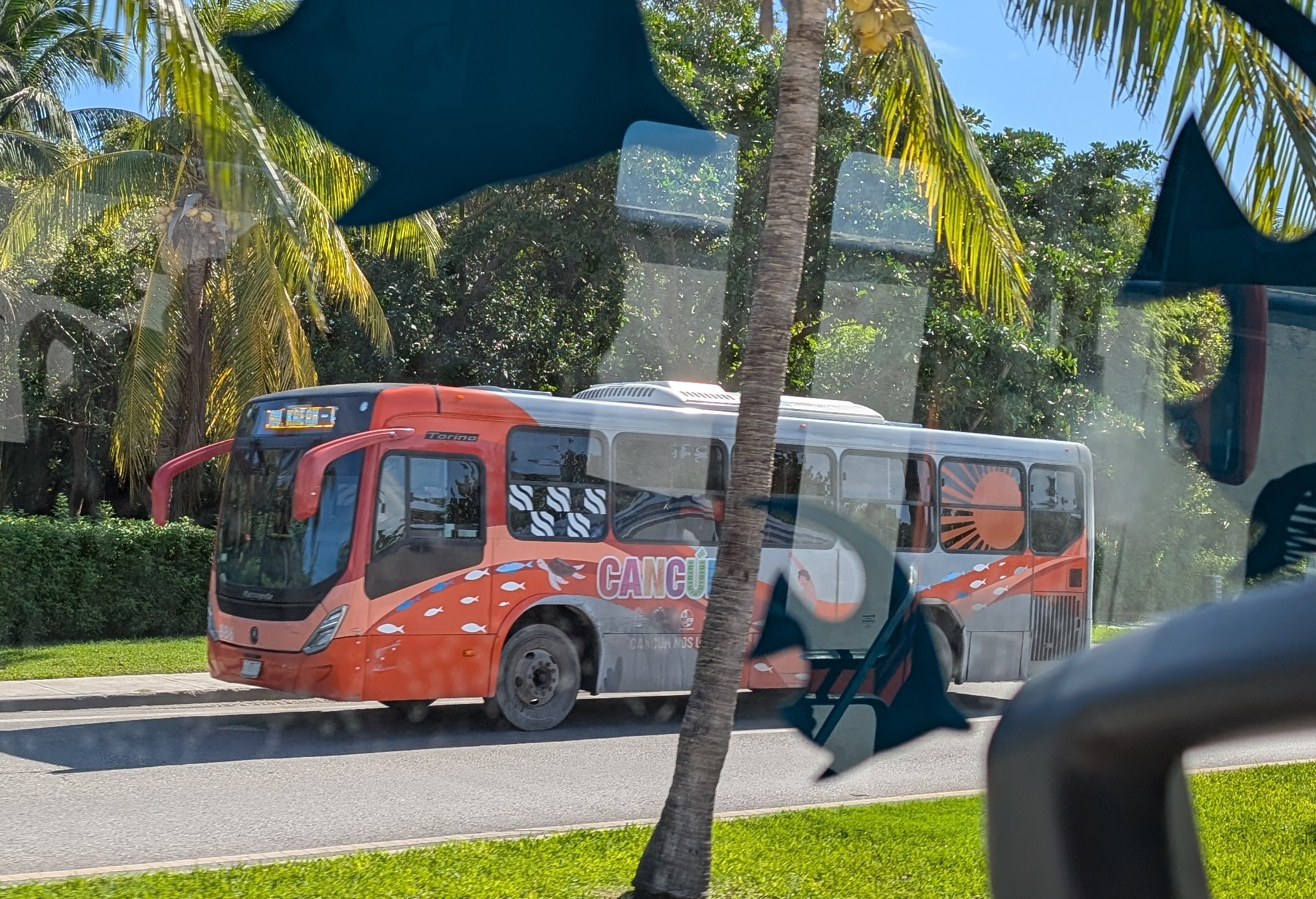
One of the new buses in Cancun's Hotel Zone.

Bus service from Cancún Airport to Downtown Cancún is provided by bus company ADO.

Cancún is also served by five public transportation companies, which are granted concessions by the Quintana Roo Institute of Mobility (Imoveqroo) or the Municipality of Benito Juárez, depending on the type of vehicles operated.

These companies include:

- Autocar S.A. de C.V. (Autocar)
- Transportación Turística y Urbana de Cancún (Turicún)
- Sociedad Cooperativa de Autotransporte del Ejido de Alfredo Vladimir Bonfil (Bonfil)
- Sociedad Cooperativa de Transporte Maya Caribe (Maya Caribe)
- Transporte Terrestre Estatal (TTE)

Together, these companies operate 36 bus routes in Cancun and its surrounding areas. Autocar operates 18 routes, both Maya Caribe and Turican operate 28, and Bonfil operates 20. TTE only operates Microbuses and Minibuses known as "combis."

Most bus routes terminate near either Plaza Las Américas, the ADO Bus Terminal, Tulum Avenue, or the Hotel Zone.

In the Hotel Zone, the main routes are R-1 and R-2, which run up Kukulkan Avenue. Operated by SEA (a joint venture between Turicun, Autocar, and Maya Caribe), services run around every 5 minutes and go between Tulum Avenue and the Westin Resort.

In April 2024, SEA announced it had received 100 new air-conditioned buses and was running them along the R-1 and R-2 routes. It was also announced that the two routes would be phased out in favor of a new corridor that ran between the Hotel Zone and Kabah Avenue, with other inner-city routes being considered.

In August 2024, it was reported that a subsidiary of ADO, which already operates buses in Mérida, was interested in operating 184 units in Cancun.

ADO AEROPUERTO (Airport) already operates long-distance bus services from its Cancun Bus Terminal, with destinations including Playa del Carmen, Tulum, Mérida and the Airport.

== Sister cities ==
- (United States) Wichita, Kansas, USA – November 25, 1975
- Hangzhou, China – October 17, 2008
- Timișoara, Romania – March 5, 2019
- (United States) Naperville, Illinois, USA – February 5, 2021

== See also ==
- Cancún Underwater Museum
- Cenote
