= Rey (surname) =

Rey is a surname. Notable people with the surname include:

- Abel Rey (1873–1940), French philosopher and historian of science.
- Alain Rey (1928–2020), French linguist, lexicographer and radio personality
- Alain Rey (ski mountaineer) (born 1982), Swiss ski mountaineer
- Alejandro Rey (1930–1987), Argentine actor
- Alexandre Rey (born 1972), Swiss former footballer
- Alvino Rey (1908–2004), American musician
- Ana del Rey (born 1985), Spanish actor
- André Rey (footballer) (born 1948), French footballer
- André Rey (psychologist) (died 1965), Swiss psychologist
- Anthony Rey (1807–1847), French Jesuit
- Bárbara Rey (born 1950), Spanish television moderator and actress
- Barret Rey, American college baseball coach
- Blanca del Rey, Spanish flamenco dancer and choreographer
- Corinne Rey-Bellet (1972–2006), Swiss alpine skier
- Dominique Rey (born 1952), French clergy, bishop of Fréjus-Toulon
- Émile Rey (1846-1895), alpine mountain guide
- Eugene Rey (1838–1909), German chemist and ornithologist
- Fernando Rey (1917–1994), the stage name of Spanish-born actor Fernando Casado D'Arambillet
- Gabriel Venance Rey (1763–1836), French general of the French Revolution and Napoleonic Wars
- Hans Rey (born 1966), German cyclist
- H. A. Rey (1898–1977) and Margret Rey (1906–1996), authors of the Curious George series of children's books
- Jacques Rey (born 1942), French politician
- Jean-Baptiste Rey (1734-1810), French conductor and composer
- Jean Rey (physician), French physician and chemist
- Jean Rey (politician) (1902–1983), Belgian Liberal politician, former president of the European Commission
- Jean-Yves Rey (born 1970), Swiss ski mountaineer
- José Manuel Rey (born 1975), Venezuelan football player
- Julio Rey (born 1972), Spanish marathon runner
- Johnny Rey (1963–2006), American actor, model, and director
- Lana Del Rey (born 1985), American singer, songwriter, record producer, and model
- Louis-Charles-Joseph Rey (1738–1811), cellist and composer
- Louis Emmanuel Rey (1768–1846), French general of the French Revolution and Napoleonic Wars
- Luis Rey (disambiguation)
- Nicholas Andrew Rey (1938–2009), United States ambassador
- María Luján Rey (born 1969), Argentine politician
- Marie Michele Rey (1938–2019), Haitian politician
- Micheline Calmy-Rey (born 1945), Swiss politician
- Mona Louise Rey (born 2004), Filipino actress
- Ofelia Rey Castelao, Spanish historian, writer, and university professor
- Paola Rey (born 1979), Colombian actress
- Reynaldo Rey (1940–2015), American actor and comedian
- Robert Rey, plastic surgeon and subject of Dr. 90210 reality television show
- Tony Rey (musician) (born 1960), American guitarist
- Willy Rey (1949–1973), Playboy Playmate of the Month, February 1971

== Fictional characters ==
- Samandahl Rey, comic book character
- Cecile Rey, American Girl historical character from 1850s New Orleans

== See also ==
- Rey (disambiguation)
- Rey (given name)
- Rei (name)
