= Rey =

Rey or REY may refer to:

- Rey (given name), a given name
- Rey (surname), a surname
- Rey, a character in the Star Wars films
- Rey, Iran, a city in Iran
- Ray County, in Tehran Province of Iran
- Rey (film), a 2015 Indian film
- The Rey Commission of the European Union
- Rey (band), a Japanese band who perform theme songs
- Corey Lewis, a comic book creator also known as "Rey"

== See also ==
- Reyes (disambiguation)
- El Rey (disambiguation)
- Del Rey (disambiguation)
- Rei (disambiguation)
