= Live at the El Rey =

Live at the El Rey may refer to:

- Live at The El Rey, a 2005 album by Collide
- Live at the El Rey (EP), a 2006 EP by Mutemath
- Live at the El Rey (film), a concert DVD featuring comic singer-songwriter Stephen Lynch
- Live from the El Rey Theatre, a 2013 album by Jack's Mannequin

== See also ==
- El Rey Theatre (disambiguation)
