= Rey (given name) =

Rey is a given name. Notable people with the name include:

- Domingo Rey d'Harcourt, Spanish military officer
- Rey Bucanero, the ring name of wrestler Arturo García Ortiz
- Rey Echavarria Bulay, Filipino lawyer
- Rey Galang, Filipino martial artist
- Rey Hernandez, American politician
- Rey Maualuga, American college football player
- Rey Mysterio Jr., the ring name of wrestler Oscar Gutierrez
- Rey Misterio, the ring name of wrestler Miguel Ángel López Díaz
- Rey Pagtakhan, Canadian parliamentarian
- Rey Quiñones, Puerto Rican baseball player
- Rey Ruiz, Cuban singer
- Rey Sánchez, Puerto Rican baseball player
- Rey Valera, Filipino musician
- Rej Volpato, Italian footballer
- Rey Washam, American drummer
- Rey Sweek, Three-day event (Friday to Sunday)
- Jonathan Rey Bornstein, American-Israeli soccer player

== Fictional characters named Rey ==
- Rey (Star Wars), a character in the Star Wars films
- Rey Yan (Chronicles of the Cursed Sword), anime character
- Rey Za Burrel, Gundam anime character
- Rey Curtis, Law & Order detective, played by Benjamin Bratt

== See also ==
- Rey (disambiguation)
- Rey (surname)
- Rei (name)
