= Luis Reyes =

Luis Reyes may refer to:

== Academia, business and politics ==
- Luis Reyes Ugarte (1902–1993), Chilean politician
- Luis Reyes Reyes (born 1952), Venezuelan politician and army officer, twice governor of Lara
- Luis Reyes (businessman) (born 1977), Salvadoran businessman
- Luis Carlos Reyes (born 1984), Colombian academic and politician

== Sportspeople ==
- Luis Reyes (Bolivian footballer) (1911-unknown), Bolivian football defender
- Luis Reyes (Colombian footballer) (born 1954), Colombian football centre-back
- Luis Reyes (Honduran footballer) (born 1958), Honduran football forward
- Luis Reyes (Mexican footballer) (born 1991), Mexican football left-back
