= Luis Rey =

Luis Rey may refer to:

- Luis Rey (artist) (born 1955), Spanish-Mexican artist
- Luis Rey (footballer) (born 2002), Mexican footballer
- Luis Rey (politician) (born 1967), Spanish politician
- Luisito Rey (1945–1992), Spanish music executive

== See also ==
- Luis Reyes (disambiguation)
- Louis Rey (disambiguation)
