= Mayan Museum of Cancún =

Museum of Mayan history in Cancún, Mexico

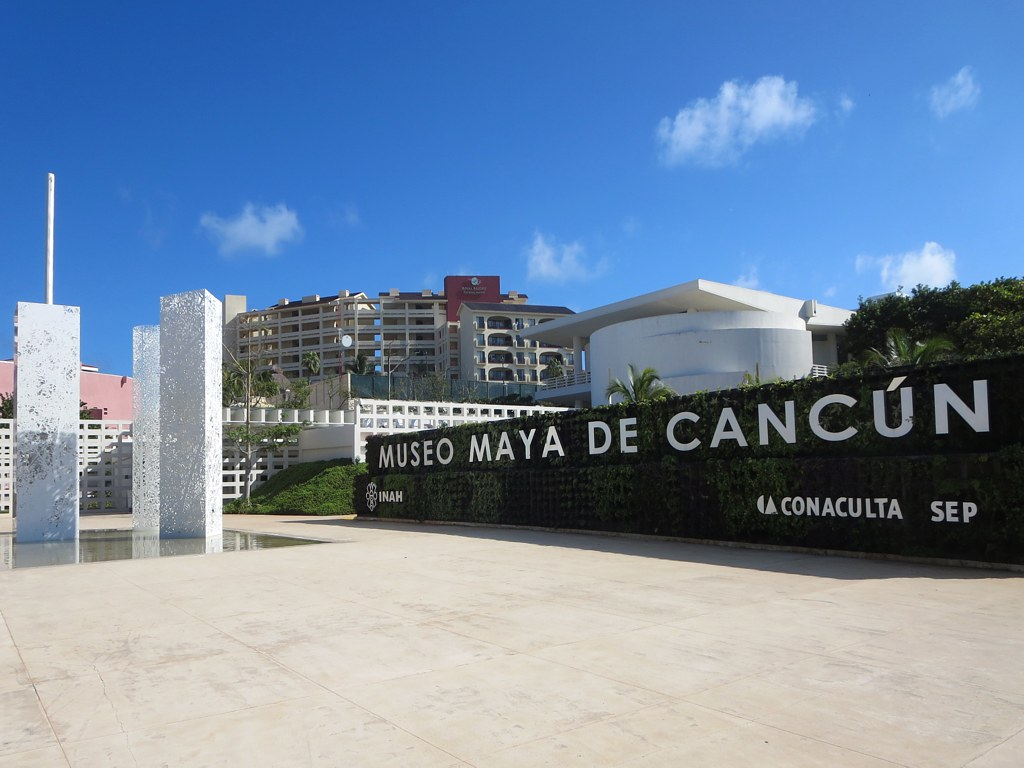

- Location in Mexico
- Established: November 2, 2012; 13 years ago
- Location: Blvd. Kukulcán Km. 16.5, Hotel Zone, Cancún; Quintana Roo, Mexico
- Coordinates: 21°04′26″N 86°46′38″W
- Type: Archaeology museum
- Collection size: 350
- Director: Carlos Alberto Esperón Vilchis
- Architect: Alberto García Lascurain
- Owner: Instituto Nacional de Antropología e Historia
- Website: Mayan Museum of Cancún

The Mayan Museum of Cancún (Spanish: Museo Maya de Cancún) is an archaeology museum located in the Hotel Zone of Cancún, Quintana Roo, Mexico.

== History ==
Construction started in 2006 and the museum opened on November 2, 2012. It was built in part to go along with the 2012 phenomenon which marked the end of the Mayan Long Count calendar on December 21 of that year.

The project cost $15 million to build and was over 70% funded by the federal government of Mexico through its Instituto Nacional de Antropología e Historia. It was called the most important project by the Instituto Nacional de Antropología e Historia since the Museo del Templo Mayor opened in 1987. It contains over 350 artifacts from Mayan culture which was spread throughout the Yucatán Peninsula. The building was designed by Alberto García Lascurain. The museum's director is anthropologist Carlos Alberto Esperón Vilchis.

The building is 55,000 square feet and sits on a 20-acre complex. It is surrounded by 40 Mayan structures and a 26-foot tall pyramid called the San Miguelito archaeological site.

== Gallery ==
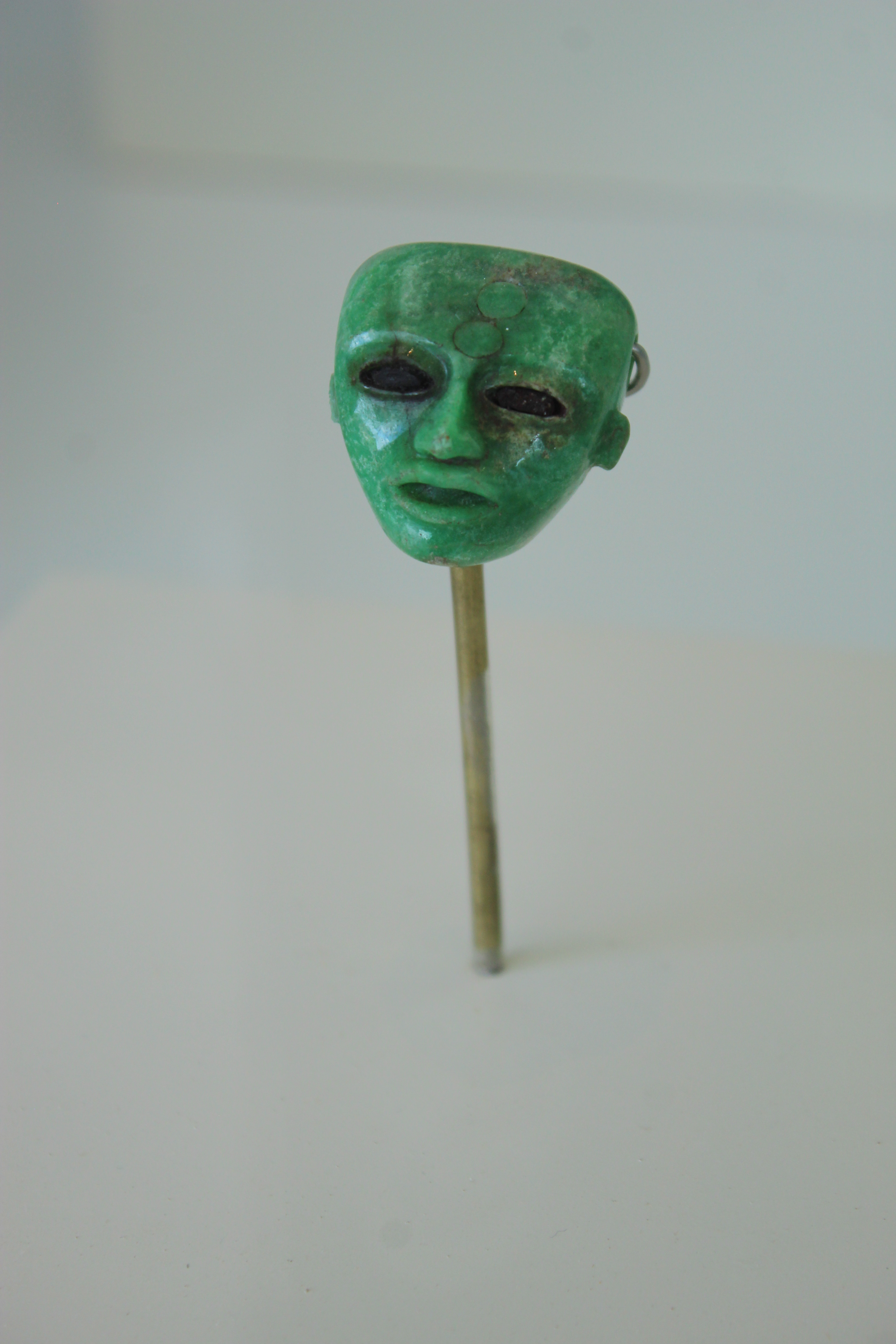
Mayan jade mask

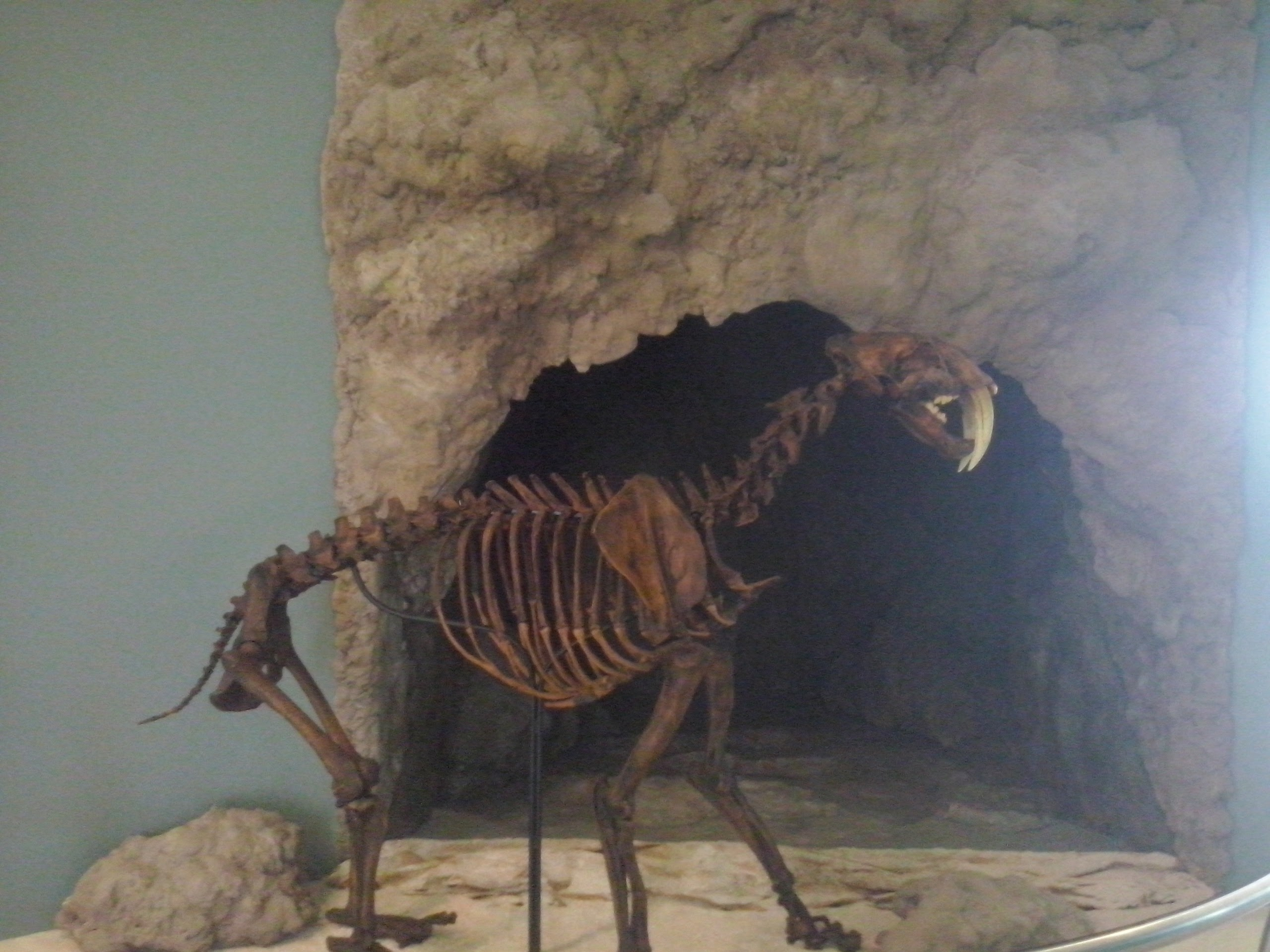

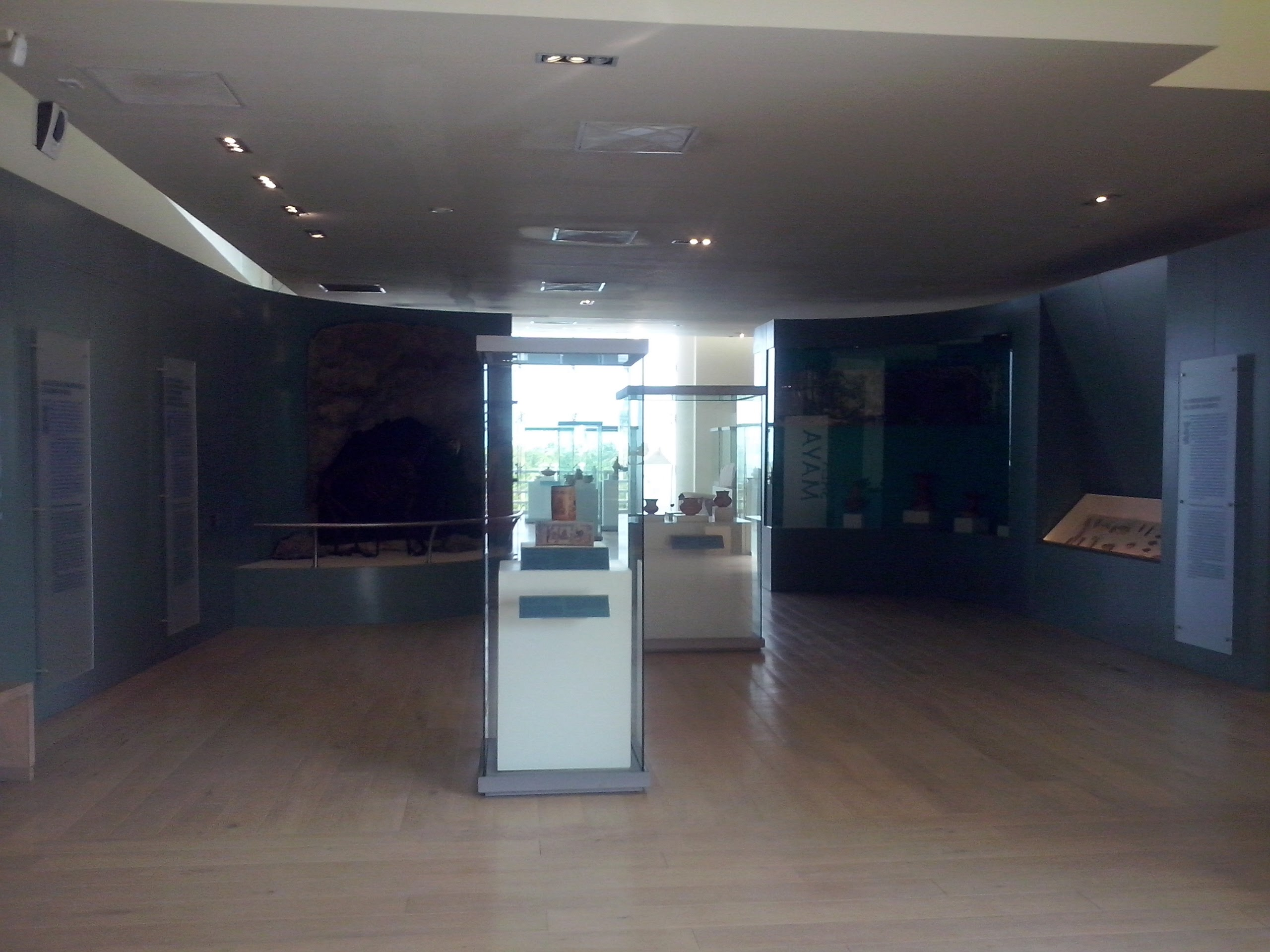

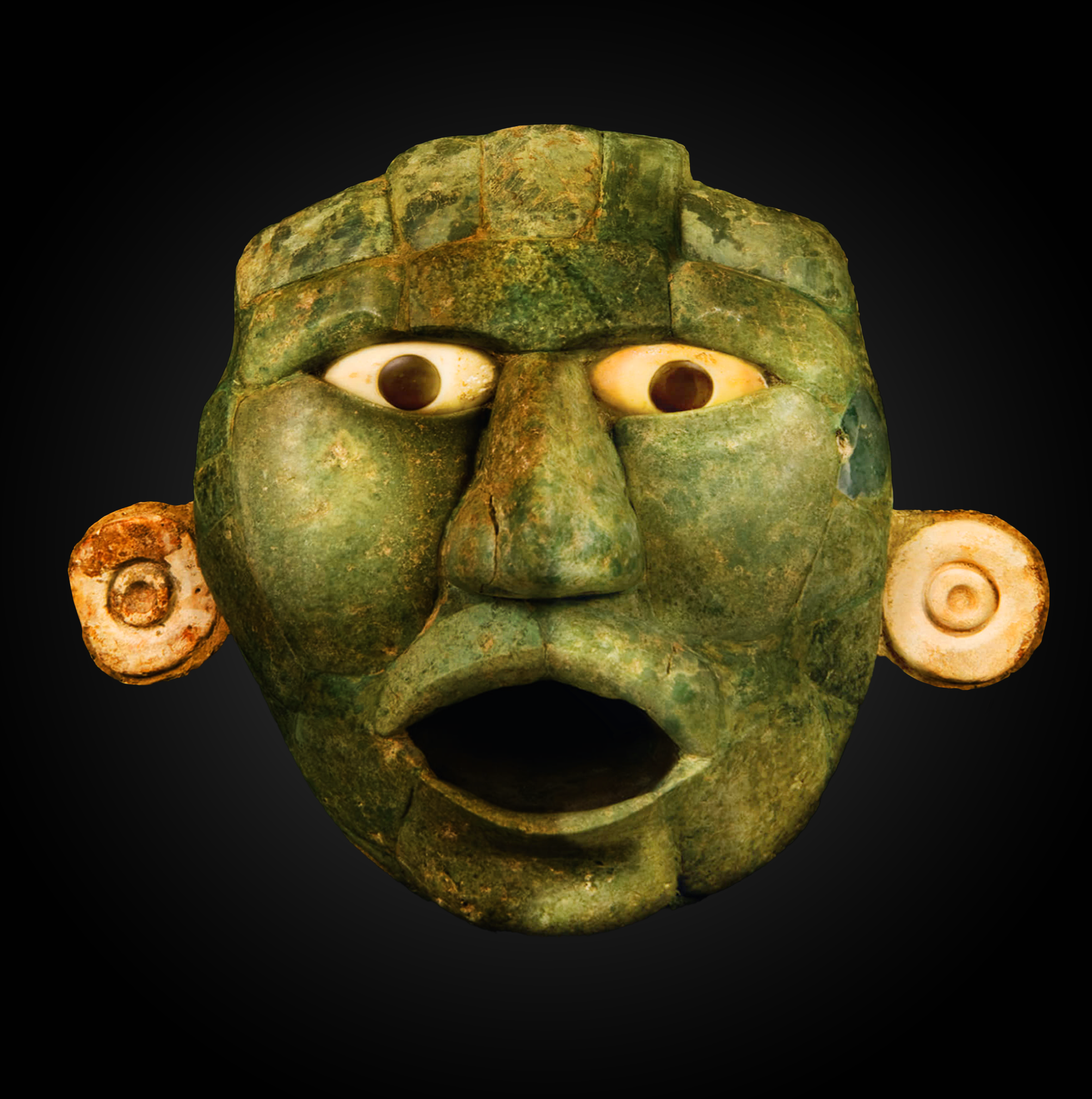
Mayan jade mask

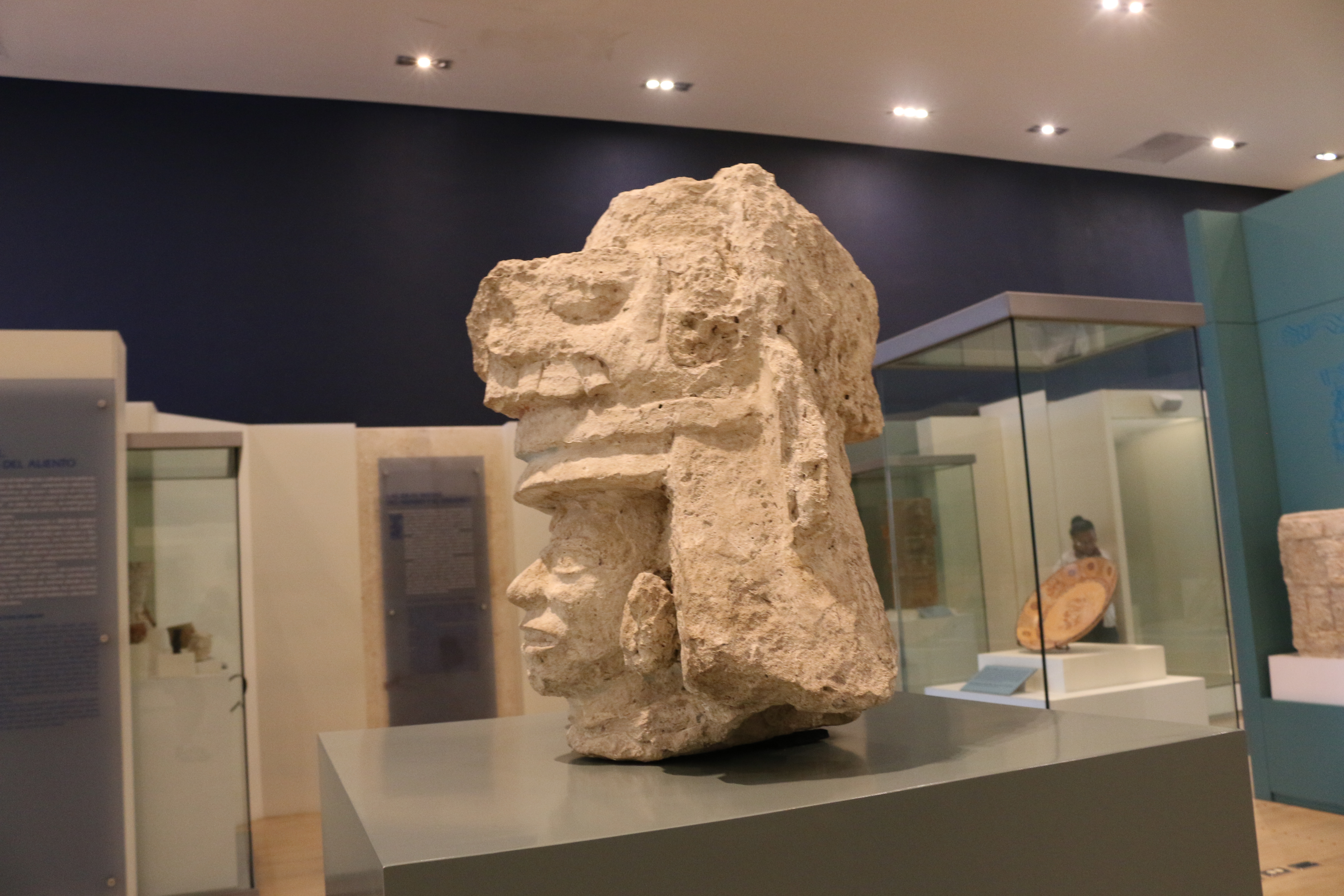

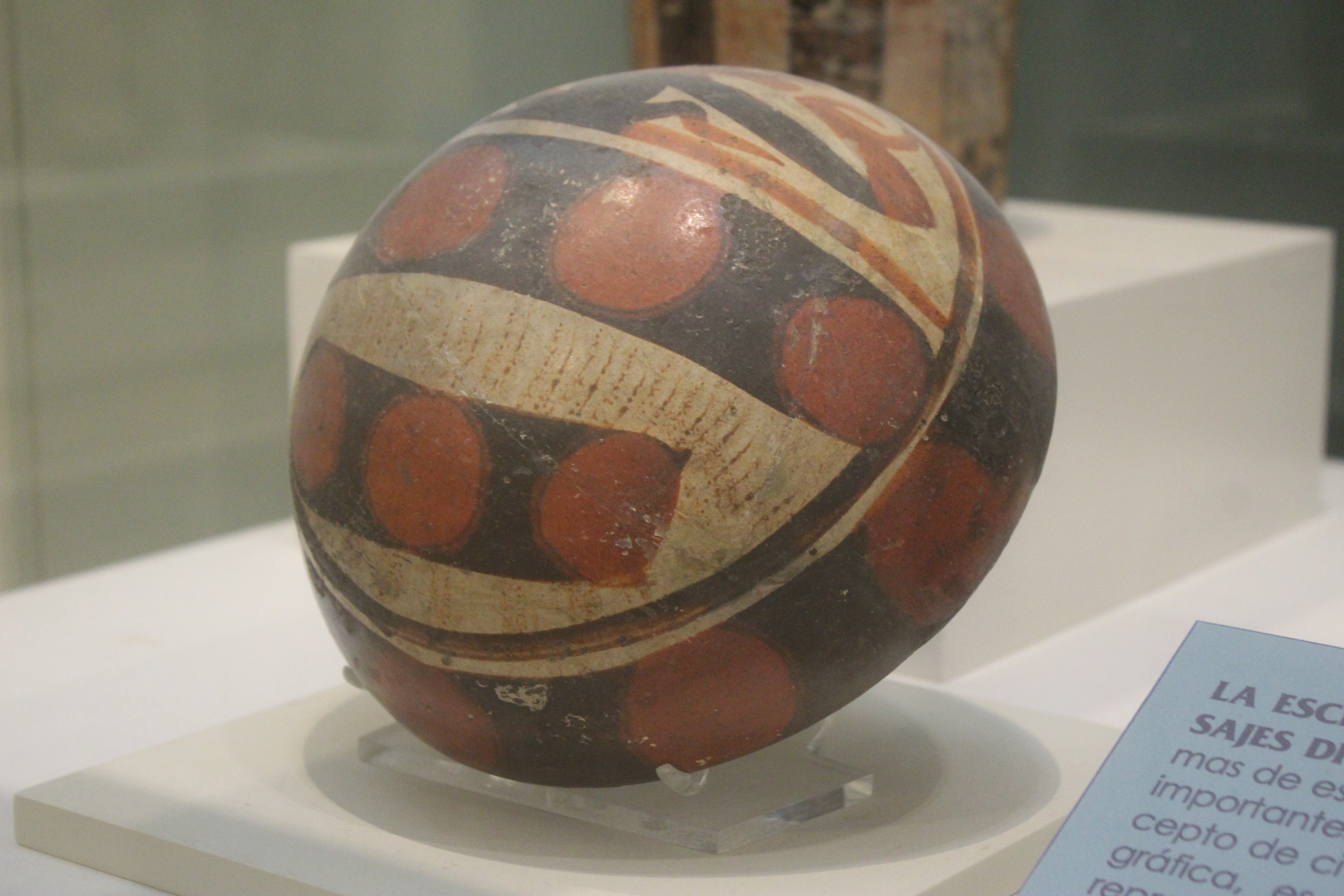

== See also ==
- El Rey archaeological site
- Yamil Lu'um
- List of museums in Mexico
