= Rei =

REI is an American retail and outdoor recreation services corporation.

Rei or REI may also refer to:

== People and fictional characters ==
=== Given name or nickname ===
- Rei (given name), including a list of people and fictional characters with the name
- Rei (footballer) (1912–1986), Brazilian footballer
- Rei (wrestler), Hong Kong professional wrestler
- Rei (singer) (born 2004), Japanese rapper and singer, member of South Korean girl group Ive
- Eusébio (1942–2014), Portuguese footballer
- Pelé (1940–2022), Brazilian footballer
- Rei Halloran (born 2006), Japanese-American ice hockey goaltender
- Reihaneh Safavi-Naini, Canadian computer scientist

=== Surname ===
- Aleksander Rei (1900–1943), Estonian politician
- August Rei (1886–1963), Estonian politician
- Leino Rei (born 1972), Estonian actor and theatre director
- Sofia Rei, Argentine musician

== Transport ==
- Reigate railway station (National Rail station code REI), Surrey, England
- Redlands Municipal Airport (FAA LID airport code REI), San Bernardino County, California, United States

== Other uses ==
- International Conference on Radiation Effects in Insulators
- Railway Engineering Institution, the professional institution for railway infrastructure and systems engineers and operators
- Reaction Engines Inc., an American aerospace manufacturer
- Rede de Emissoras Independentes, a defunct Brazilian television network
- rei, ISO 639-3 code for the Reli language, spoken in India
- Remote error indication, in synchronous optical networking
- Reproductive endocrinology and infertility, a surgical subspecialty of obstetrics and gynecology
- Rei, a story arc of the anime Higurashi When They Cry
- Rochester Electronics Incorporated, a semiconductor manufacturer*

== See also ==
- Cristo Rei (disambiguation)
- Reis (disambiguation)
- Rey (disambiguation)
- Rei Rei, a video animation series
