= El Rey archaeological site =

Archaeological site in Quintana Roo, Mexico

Coordinates: 21°03′40″N 86°46′53″W

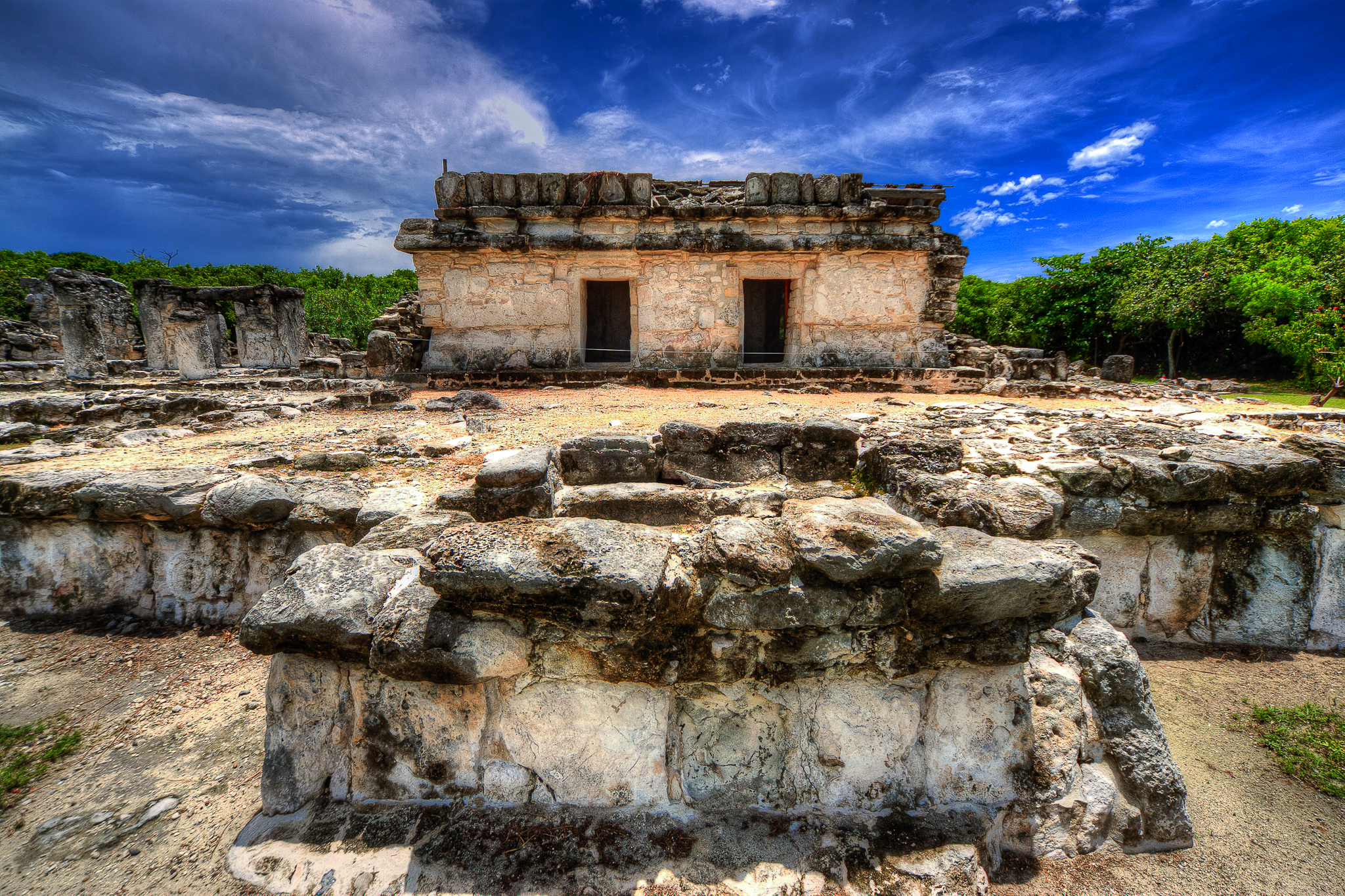
El Rey archaeological site

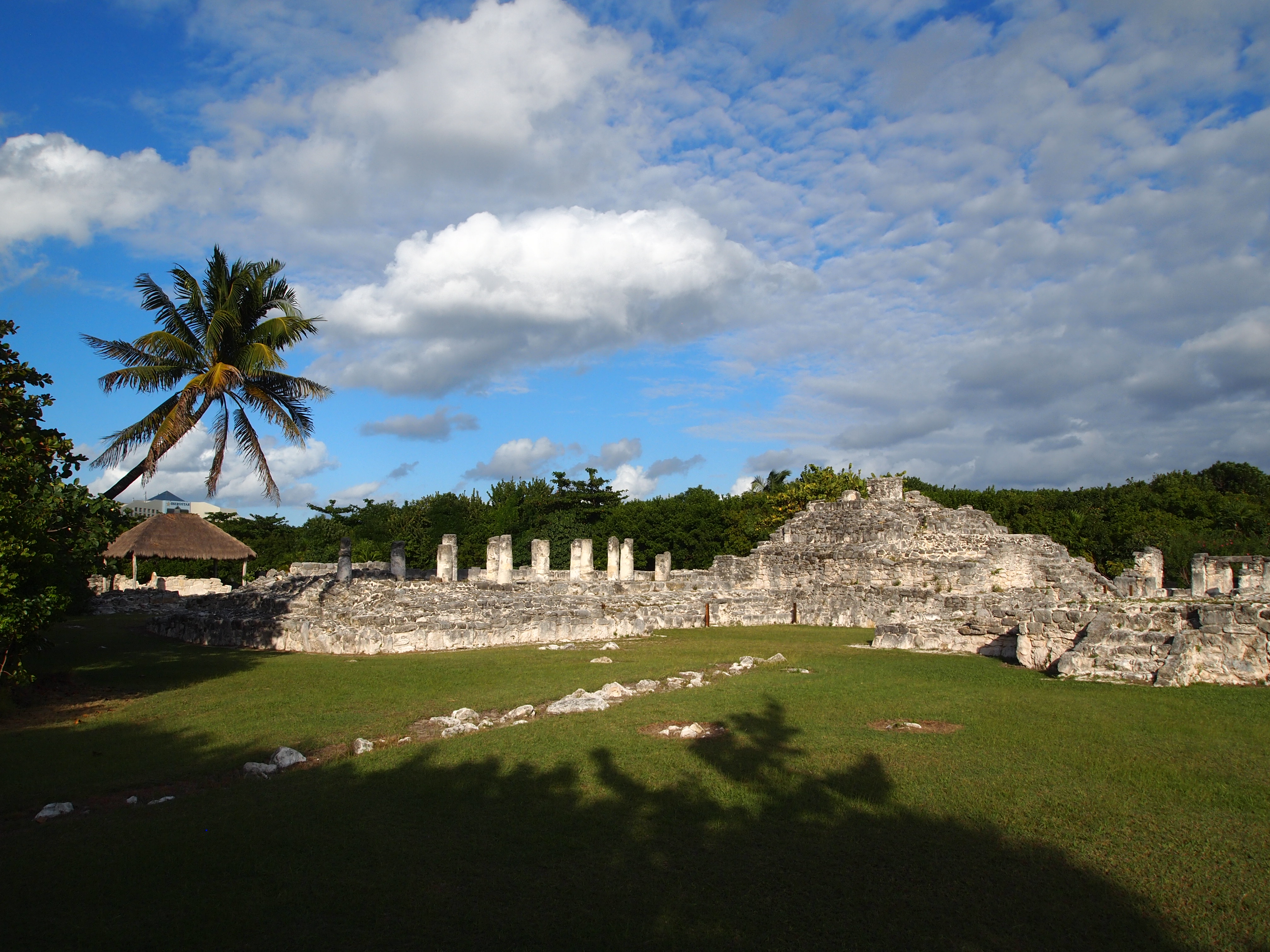
Structure 22.1 (the columned temple) at El Rey.

El Rey is an archaeological site of the pre-Columbian Mayan culture, located in the southeast of Mexico, in the tourist resort of Cancun, in the state of Quintana Roo.

== Geography ==
The El Rey site is located on the Mexican coast of the Caribbean Sea, in the Hotel Zone of the island of Cancun. The island is located on the outskirts of the city centre and is connected by two bridges to the mainland.

The original name in the Mayan language is not known. In 1909 two English travelers Channing Arnold and Frederick Frost visited the site and found an anthropomorphic sculpture of what was interpreted as a monarch or a noble person. The name El Rey ("the king") comes from a sculpture that resembles a monarch, the head of which is preserved in the Archaeological Museum of Cancun.

== History ==
The site reached its housing peak probably in the early classical period (250-600 AD). The first settlers built houses on platforms, although the organic materials used have not been preserved over the centuries.

Between the years 200 and 1200 AD. the inhabitants of the site worked as fishermen and in salt extraction.

In a later period the site gained importance because immigrants arrived from the interior of the Yucatan Peninsula, approximately between 1300 and 1500 AD. The structures that can currently be seen date from then.

Within the coastal commercial network El Rey was one of the ports on the Caribbean coast. Other important ports in the south were Xcaret, Xelha, Tulum, and Muyil.

After the arrival of the Spaniards in the sixteenth century, the site was abandoned by the Mayans.

== Archaeology ==
El Rey is the most important archaeological site on the island of Cancun. It is made up of 47 structures of varying functions. Archaeologists have found remains of mural paintings and drawings dating from the post-classical period.

During the excavation of a temple in 1975, archaeologists found the burial site of a person of high rank, with a copper axe, a bracelet, and ornaments of shell and bone.

== Gallery ==
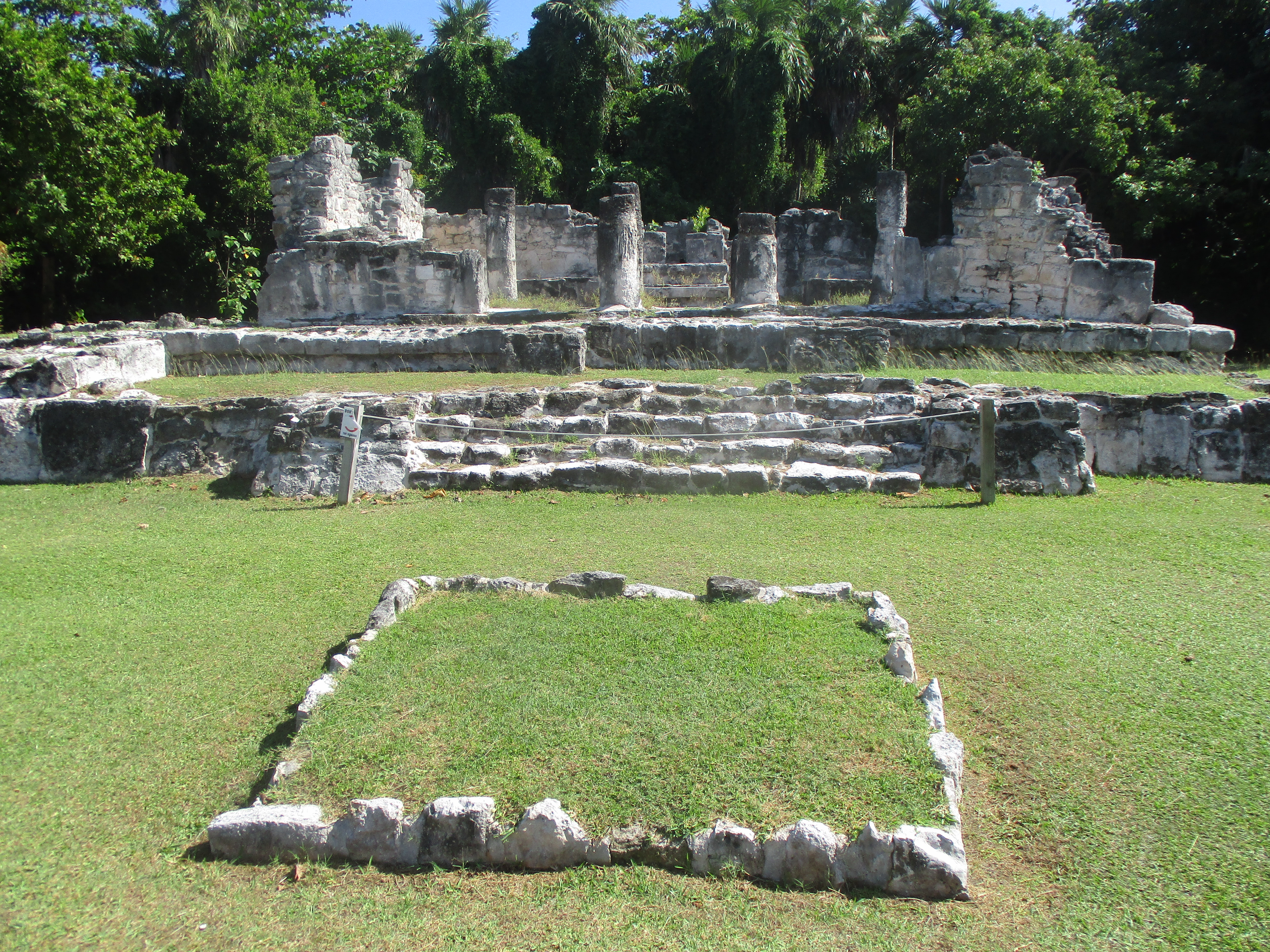

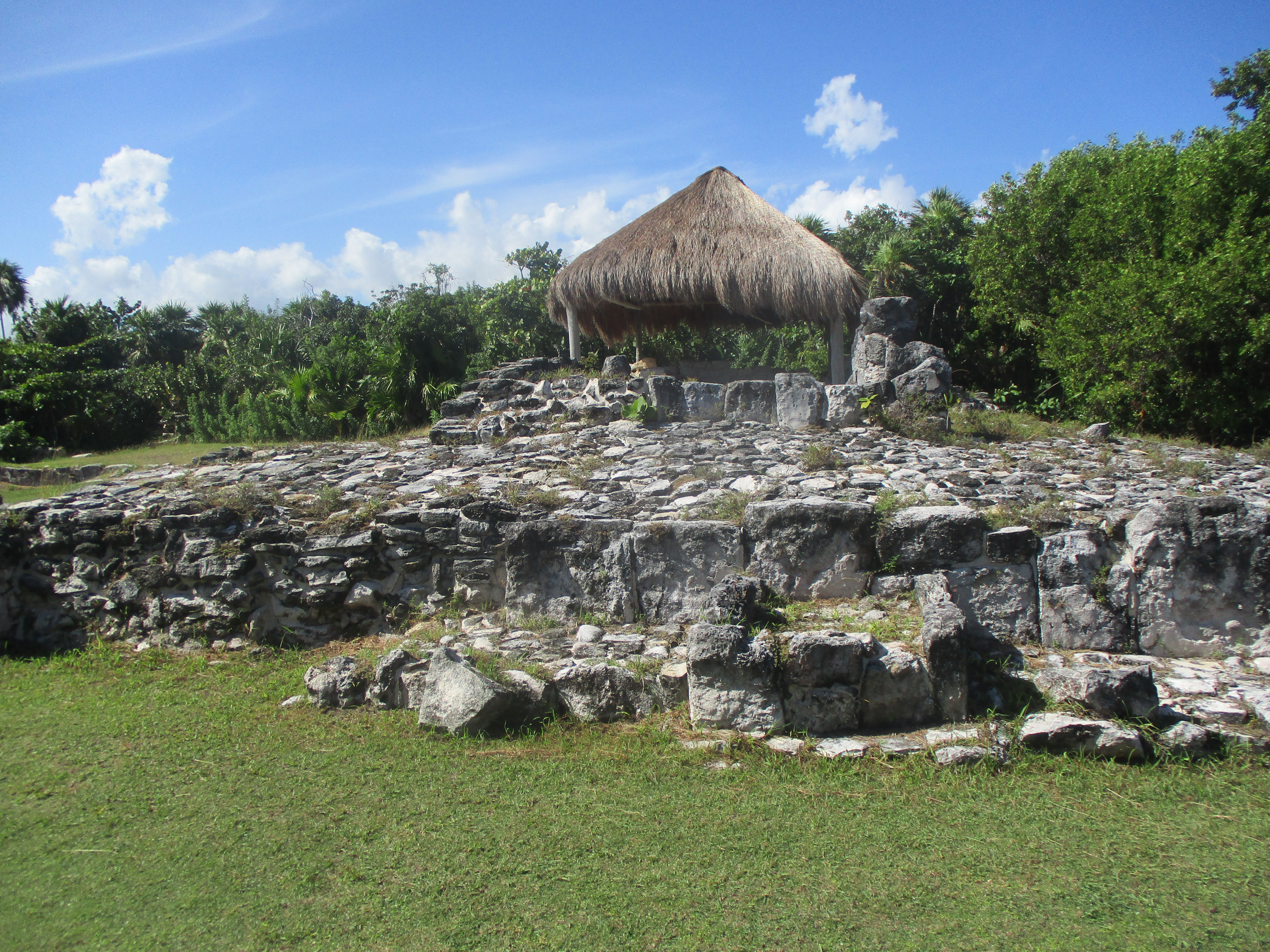

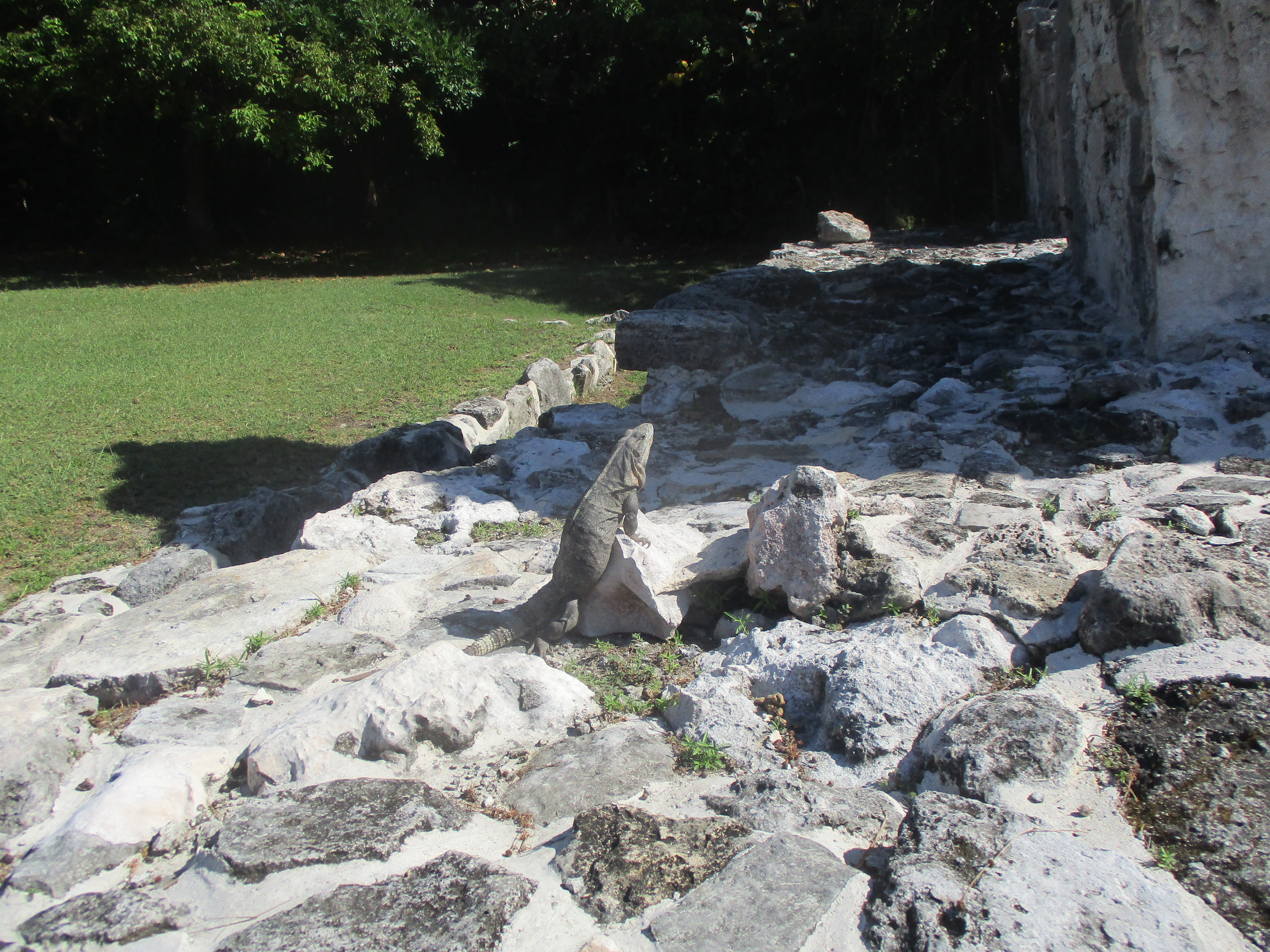
