= Noh Kah =

Mayan City of the Classical Era and Archealogical Site in Quintana Roo, Mexico

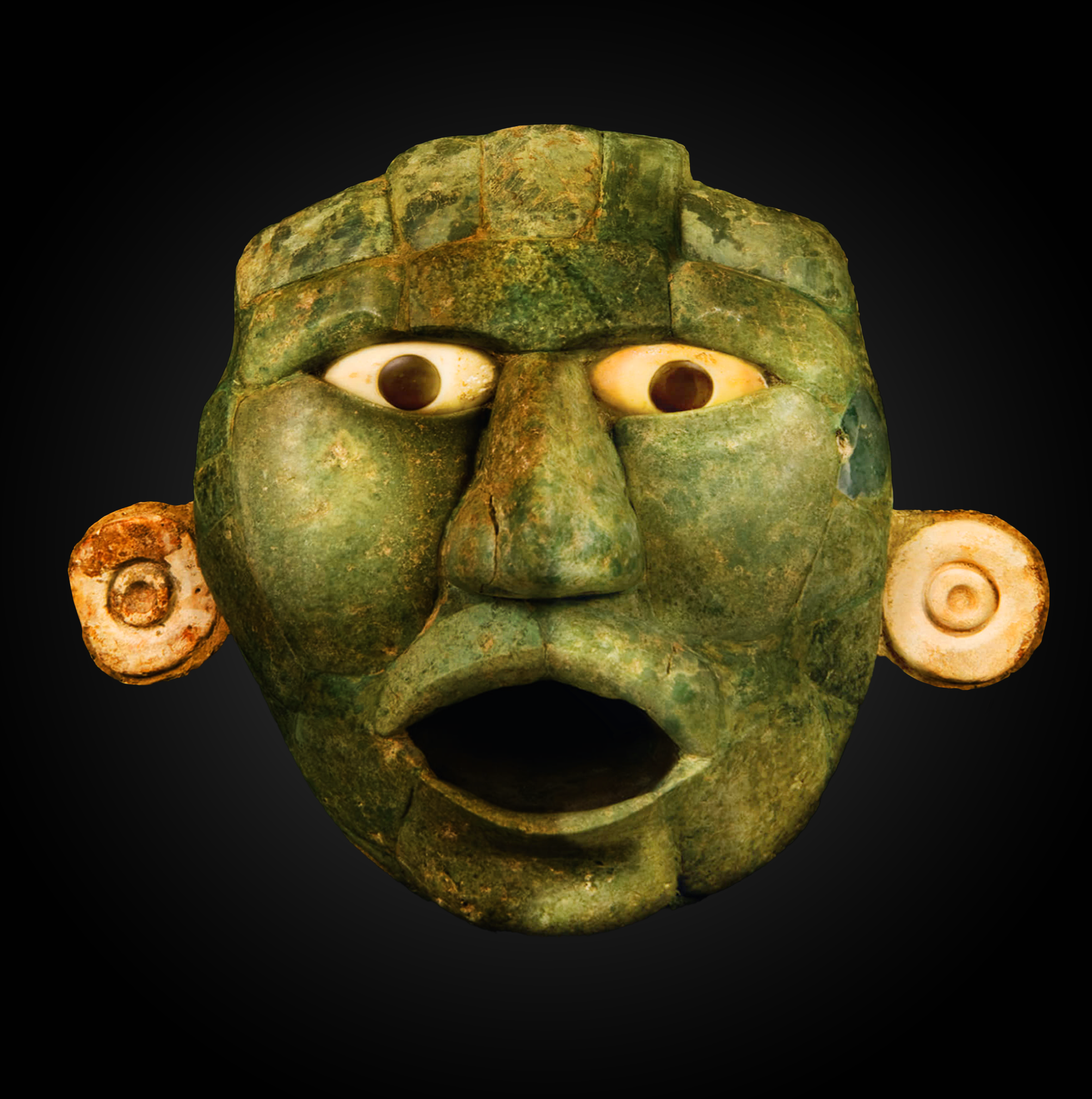
- Ceremonial jade mask found at Noh Kah
- Interactive map of Noh Kah
- Type: Ancient Maya city
- Periods: Classic
- Cultures: Maya civilization
- Location: Mexico
- Region: Quintana Roo

History
- Built: 200 AD
- Abandoned: 900 AD

Site notes
- Area: 36 km

Noh Kah is an ancient Maya city and archaeological site located in the jungle of southern Quintana Roo in Mexico. Noh Kah developed during the early and late Classic period of the Maya civilization, around the years 200 to 900 AD and was a large Maya settlement near the region dominated by the Kaan dynasty of Dzibanche in southern Quintana Roo.

== Archaeology ==
According to archaeological and topographic research, the discovered area of Noh Kah covers about 34 km, most of the site structures are buried in the thick jungle including pyramids and temples inside six architectural complexes called Hop Ná, El Veinte, El Corozal, El Pocito, El Pich and El Paredón. This settlement construction made up of several large complexes instead of one main monumental complex has been identified throughout the Maya region of southern Quintana Roo in near sites such as Pol Box, El Resbalón, La Juventud and La Unión, an architectural style influenced by Dzibanche.

Two construction stages have been identified at the site, the first around the year 200 AD in the Early Classic period at the beginning of the construction of the first monumental structures in the city and the second occurred during the Late Classic period due to the influence of the Río Bec region of Campeche.

El Paredón complex includes a large stone wall dating from the year 600 AD, this was the first structure to be discovered at the site.
