= El Rey Theatre =

El Rey Theatre may refer to:

- El Rey Theatre (Los Angeles), California, U.S.
- El Rey Theatre (San Francisco, California), U.S.

== See also ==
- Live at the El Rey (disambiguation)
