= Luis Reyes (businessman) =

American businessman (born 1959)

Luis Alonso Reyes
- Born: September 6, 1959 (age 67)
- Occupation: businessman
- Known for: Co-owner of Cactus Cantina and Lauriol Plaza
- Spouse: Lorena Ruano (m. 1992)
- Children: 2, Claudia-Isabella and Daniella-Fernanda

Luis Alonso Reyes (born September 6, 1959) is a U.S. businessman from El Salvador. He co-owns the restaurants Cactus Cantina and Lauriol Plaza, both in Washington, D.C. Reyes immigrated to The United States in 1977. Reyes has worked on multiple presidential races for the Farabundo Martí National Liberation Front (FMLN) in his native country of El Salvador.

== Early life ==
Reyes grew up in San Miguel, El Salvador, in a house without indoor plumbing or running water. Reyes left El Salvador in 1977 with only $150. Although he paid $450 to a coyote to smuggle him into the United States, the coyote abandoned Reyes and 54 others in the desert outside Piedras Negras, Mexico, near the Texas border. Without food or shelter for a total of five days, Reyes decided with four others to continue on into the United States.

Reyes worked in California picking tomatoes in the fields for about a year until he made enough money to meet a friend in Washington DC.

He arrived in Washington DC on New Year's Day, 1978. He moved into a studio apartment with nine roommates. Reyes worked as a dish washer at a steak house.

== Personal life ==
Reyes became a US Citizen in 1986 after his employer-sponsored him for residency. In 1992 Reyes married Lorena Ruano; they have two daughters.

== Business Ventures ==
After years of living in the United States illegally, his employer sponsored Reyes for residency. By 1983 he had saved a total of $20,000 which he used to co-found Lauriol Plaza. After becoming a US Citizen in 1986, he and his business partner opened Cactus Cantina.
