= Dorranai Hassan =

German-Afghan footballer

Personal information
- Date of birth: 31 January 2000 (age 26)
- Place of birth: Berlin, Germany
- Position: Goalkeeper

Team information
- Current team: Hertha 03 Zehlendorf

International career
Years	Team	Apps	(Gls)
2016–	Afghanistan		

Dorranai Hassan (born 31 January 2000) is a footballer who plays as a goalkeeper for her current club FC Hertha 03 Zehlendorf. Born in Germany, she represented the Afghanistan women's national team. Hassan's father came to Germany from Afghanistan to study in 1972 and it was in Berlin, where she was born and raised.

== Club career ==
Hassan made her debut for her club FC Hertha 03 Zehlendorf B on 10 September 2016, playing full 90 minutes of the match. She has been playing for three straight seasons for FC Hertha 03 Zehlendorf B, since 2016–17 and has made a total of 18 appearances, playing a total of 1620 minutes. In the 2016–17 season, she played for her club in the 11er Women LL and in the Women Berlin League for the 2017–18 season and presently, the 2018–19 season.

== International career ==
Hassan made her debut for Afghanistan against defending champions India in Siliguri at the South-Asian Championship and were defeated by a 5–1 scoreline. Like most other Afghan women football players, she had to stay away from residing in Afghanistan due to the Taliban issue. The history of the Afghan women's team is young, of which Hassan is a part. It was founded in 2007 and first successes came in that year as the winner of the Pakistan league and in 2012 as semi-finalist of the South Asian Cup. The team is currently ranked 109 out 115 in the world rankings.

== See also ==
- Hanifa Yousoufi
- Afghanistan women's national football team
- Shabnam Mobarez
