= Villa Marina =

Villa Marina may refer to:

- Villa Marina (race horse), a Thoroughbred racehorse
- Villa Marina, Isle of Man, an entertainment venue in Douglas, Isle of Man
- Villa Marina Hotel, a building in Ensenada, Baja California
