= Violent Lips =

Violent Lips, LLC
- Company type: Private
- Industry: Consumer goods
- Founded: 2011
- Founders: Jeff Haddad; Isabella Haddad; Sophia Haddad
- Headquarters: Los Angeles, California
- Products: Cosmetics
- Website: www.violentlips.com (Defunct)

Violent Lips was a cosmetics company which commercialized temporary tattoo decals for the lips that created designs not possible with traditional lipstick, such as rainbows, animal prints, and polka dots.

== History ==
Violent Lips was founded by talent manager Jeff Haddad and co-created by his daughters, Isabella and Sophia Haddad. The idea for the company began when Haddad's daughters, then aged 13 and 9, applied temporary tattoos to their lips as a joke. Isabella Haddad served as the company's CEO during its later operations.

In 2011, Violent Lips partnered with Sugar Factory to launch candy-themed temporary lip tattoos. In 2014, the brand gained significant viral attention after being featured in a video by YouTuber grav3yardgirl, which reached over eight million views.

In 2016, the company expanded its product line to include "Minis," press-on emoji tattoos that could be applied to the lips, eyes, or other face areas. The products were popularized by celebrities including Khloé Kardashian, Kendall Jenner, Kylie Jenner, and Keyshia Cole.

=== Cessation of operations ===
The company's commercial activity declined significantly after 2017. The UK-based entity, Violent Lips Limited, was officially dissolved in the early 2020s. By January 14, 2024, the brand's official website was defunct and remains inactive as of 2026. Remaining inventory is primarily sold through third-party retail platforms and liquidation sites.
