= The Real World: Cancun =

Coordinates: 21°06′43″N 86°45′34″W

- Season 22
- The cast of The Real World: Cancun
- Starring: Ayiiia Elizarraras; Bronne Bruzgo; CJ Koegel; Derek Chavez; Emilee Fitzpatrick; Jasmine Reynaud; Joey Rozmus; Jonna Mannion
- No. of episodes: 12

Release
- Original network: MTV
- Original release: June 24 – September 9, 2009

Season chronology
- ← Previous; The Real World: Brooklyn Next → The Real World: D.C.

The Real World: Cancun is the twenty-second season of MTV's reality television series The Real World, which focuses on a group of diverse strangers living together for several months in a different city each season, as cameras follow their lives and interpersonal relationships. It is the only season of The Real World to be filmed in Mexico.

The season featured eight people who lived in a hotel converted into a suite. It is the fourth season of The Real World to be set outside the United States, after The Real World: London in 1995, The Real World: Paris in 2003, and The Real World: Sydney in 2007. Series co-creator Jonathan Murray explained the choice of Cancun, saying, "Cancun is a good one to do after Brooklyn, which was a more gritty environment."

Primary production started from January 26 to April 2009 and was not affected by the swine flu outbreak in Mexico. Executive Producer Jim Johnston said, "We had stopped production before this thing reared its ugly head." Consisting of 12 episodes, the season premiered June 24 of that year and was viewed by 1.4 million viewers, the smallest debut ever for a season of The Real World at the time. The American synthpop band LMFAO has a guest appearance in Episode 7, which ties into the cast's work assignment.

The show's theme, heard during the opening titles, is called "Sex on the Beach" and performed by 3OH!3.

Bunim-Murray Productions also shot an unscripted 2003 movie called The Real Cancun, although it was unrelated to the series.

== Assignment ==
Most seasons of The Real World, beginning with its fifth season, have included the assignment of a season-long group job or task to the housemates, continued participation in which has been mandatory to remain part of the cast since the Back to New York season. The Cancun cast was assigned to work with StudentCity, an organization that helps visiting college students and, as Jonathan Murray put it, "give people a safe and fun vacation."

== The residence ==
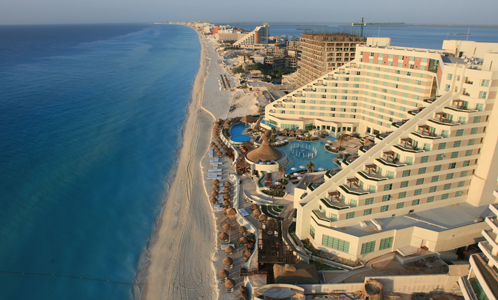
The former ME Cancun, now Melody Maker Cancún hotel, where the cast resided.

The cast stayed at the ME Cancun resort (later called Melody Maker Cancún) at Boulevard Kukulkan, km. 12 in Cancun, Mexico. The resort is located in the Hotel Zone between the Beach Palace and Park Royal Piramides resorts. Fifteen hotel rooms were converted into the cast's suite: eleven on the second floor, and four rooms on the third floor. Production Designer Chuck Aubrey used the hotel's signature furnishings to decorate the suite, along with the vivid colors that are typically used by the Real World production to adorn the residences. The suite, like all of the resort's other 418 rooms, features an ocean and sunset lagoon view. The suite was available to the public under the name SuiteMe. The suite was later used as the vacation residence for the cast of the 2011 Las Vegas season, as seen in Episode 11 of that season.

== Cast ==
The cast is made up of eight individuals, in line with the prior season. Two of the cast members, Jonna Mannion and Derek Chavez, previously worked together at a bar in Tempe, Arizona, and are the first set of cast members in a season to be acquainted with one another prior to casting, since David Burns and Nathan Blackburn from The Real World: Seattle.

Cast member	Age^{1}	Hometown
Ayiiia Elizarraras	22	San Diego, California
Ayiiia is a model and Hooters waitress who won the realworldcasting.com contest, having been chosen by viewers who voted for her with the help of a campaign run by her friends. She says she has "an issue with guys" due to her last boyfriend, with whom she got pregnant, and who broke up with her a week before she had an abortion. Despite having a boyfriend named Ryan and insisting she is not a lesbian, she enjoys making out with women, and becomes intimate with both Jonna and Emilee. She is of Mexican descent, and this is her first extended trip to that country. She is not easily forgiving, and her candor is sometimes seen as vicious by her roommates, which makes living in the house difficult for her. She has a history of drug abuse and self-mutilation, the latter of which recurs in Episode 5, after repeatedly coming into conflict with various other members of the cast throughout the first several episodes, in particular Joey. In the season finale she and Joey reconcile and have sex.
Bronne Bruzgo	21	Yardley, Pennsylvania
Bronne is a student at the Pennsylvania State University and a member of the Marine ROTC. MTV describes him as the resident comic and life of the party, willing to do anything for a laugh. A former nude model and boxer on the Penn State boxing team, he struggles with boundaries, and comes into conflict with his roommates because of this. In Episode 9, he is evicted from the hotel following a drunken incident in which he throws a fire extinguisher from a hotel balcony, though he is provided with nearby alternative housing by Student City.
CJ Koegel	24	Boca Raton, Florida
CJ is an NFL free agent who was the #4 punter in the country when he graduated from the University of Massachusetts Amherst. He did well at tryouts in Las Vegas, and is awaiting the results. MTV describes him as "the All-American boy" and a "heartthrob" who takes pride in his body and his appearance overall. CJ says he would be a devout Christian if it were not for his sex drive. He had a girlfriend named Danielle back home, but the temptations of Cancun presented a challenge to their relationship, and they broke up in the first episode.
Derek Chavez	21	Phoenix, Arizona
Derek is described by MTV as the resident "nice guy", who gets along with everyone in the house. He was raised in the small town of Loving, New Mexico by his grandmother, whom he calls his mother. He is an overachiever who was president of the student council in high school, captain of the basketball and track teams, and class valedictorian. He is openly gay and single, currently uninterested in a commitment, though baggage from previous relationships continues to haunt him. He is currently pursuing a bachelor's degree in kinesiology at Arizona State University, and wants to be a physician's assistant. He worked with Jonna at a bar in Tempe, Arizona.
Emilee Fitzpatrick	21	Hamilton, Massachusetts
Emilee, like Ayiiia, is a Hooters waitress, and a daughter of therapists. MTV describes her as a sensitive girl who sometimes lets her emotions get the best of her. She is working to change her views on men, sex and love, and hoping to find a man with whom she can have a monogamous relationship, though she is intimate with Ayiiia in Episode 3. She suffers from severe Attention-deficit hyperactivity disorder, for which she takes prescription Adderall.
Jasmine Reynaud	22	Friendswood, Texas
Jasmine, despite her 5-foot frame, is outspoken, and exhibits what MTV describes as "a hard edge", which she readily admits is the result of a Napoleon complex. Despite this, she is also sensitive and vulnerable. Her friends say she has poor taste in men, often choosing womanizers who treat her badly, a motif that, according to her MTV bio, may recur in Cancun. She is a former competitive cheerleader who likes to be the center of attention, particularly among women. She enjoys partying, but may have difficulty with moderation. She works as a waitress at Chili's. Her interest in a coworker named Pat generates tension when he begins seeing Jonna.
Joey Rozmus	22	Lawrence, Massachusetts
Joey is a tall, skinny, tattooed man who plays guitar in a pop punk band called Late Nite Wars, and according to MTV, relentlessly pursues women in Cancun with his "bad boy charm", making a point of being the first roommate to have sex in Cancun. He has been expelled from two different high schools, and eventually dropped out of a third. He has a past history with excessive drinking. He is passionate about the arts, and enjoys drawing, tattooing, writing poetry, and creating music. He claims to have seen a UFO. He experiences personality conflict with the women in the first several episodes, and in particular with Ayiiia. He expresses a dislike for the cast's season assignment and his superiors, and after repeatedly missing shifts in episodes 6 and 7, he is fired and sent home in the latter episode. He returns, however, at the end of episode 11, during which he makes up with Ayiiia and has sex with her.
Jonna Mannion	20	Tempe, Arizona
Jonna is a multi-racial woman who has lived a difficult life, having been put in foster care at age four with a strict religious family, adopted by her caseworker at nine, and kicked out when she turned 18, but she intends to make the best of life as a hairdresser. She struggles between her boyfriend, Matt, back home and the temptations of Cancun, as well as her own tendencies toward flirtation and promiscuity. She worked with Derek at a bar in Tempe, Arizona. Before joining the show, Jonna, along with her partner Aaron, won the first season of the Discovery Kids competition teenage reality show, Endurance. Her behavior with men generates tension between her and the other women, in particular her relationship with Pat, a man that Jasmine was strongly attracted to, which culminates in a threesome between Jonna, Pat and Ayiiia in Episode 10.

^Note 1: Age at time of filming.

== Episodes ==
No. overall	No. in season	Title	Original release date
467	1	"Yes We Cancun!"	June 24, 2009
The cast moves into the penthouse in Cancun. Joey and Emilee experience the first conflict over his views of her occupation. At a club, Emilee and CJ exhibit a mutual attraction, and Joey makes a point of being the first in the house to have sex in Cancun. A courtesy to Joey results in a night of closeness between Emilee and CJ, and damage to CJ's relationship with his girlfriend, Danielle. The male roommates ponder whether Jonna will remain faithful to her boyfriend, Matt, and the possibilities if she doesn't.
468	2	"Jerkface Joes and Romeos"	July 1, 2009
CJ and Jonna become close, with the newly single CJ (and the others) anticipating possibilities between them should she break up with Matt. Joey experiences a personality clash with Ayiiia and the other women. The roommates meet their new boss and learn about their new job, but the restrictions and responsibilities imposed on them may pose challenges.
469	3	"I Kissed a Girl and I Liked It (At First)"	July 8, 2009
As Jonna becomes closer to the men, conflict arises in the house between them and the women, with Ayiiia and Emilee each alienating the others over various issues. Ayiiia and Emilee share a night of romantic intimacy, and Ayiiia feels like she can start trusting people again, even revealing her abortion. Ayiiia and Emilee's' relationship soon sours over conflict on the group's first day of work, and eventually, Ayiiia is pitted against the other seven.
470	4	"Cancun Cassanovas"	July 15, 2009
Ayiiia attempts to make amends with Emilee, though Emilee wonders how difficult it may be to restart their friendship. Derek enjoys a visit for his birthday from his brother, Bo, and his ex-boyfriend, Kyle, whose infidelity led to their breakup just prior to moving to Cancun. This, as well as Derek's ability to adhere to Student City rules when he meets a Student City client named Tyler, causes conflict for him. Joey's self-professed promiscuity continues, but he suffers a devastating loss that returns him home. CJ and Jasmine both meet people to whom they are attracted.
471	5	"Payback, Piglets and Projects"	July 22, 2009
CJ's romantic escapades continue, but he and Joey continue to experience conflict with Ayiiia, which leads to a huge fight, and a physical confrontation that includes threats of violence. This leads to a recurrence of Ayiiia's self-mutilation. Joey and the other men, unsympathetic when they learn of her condition, decide to enact a campaign of behavior designed to get her to leave the house. Jasmine sees a man, Pat, who she thinks is giving her mixed signals. The episode ends with a public service announcement by Ayiiia in which she states that she received professional help, and implores others exhibiting self-mutilation to do the same.
472	6	"Flirting With Disaster"	July 29, 2009
The mutual animus between Joey and Ayiiia continues, but his chafing against authority and his dislike for and delinquency at the job may jeopardize his stay in Cancun. Jonna enjoys a visit from her boyfriend, Matt, though questions on his part about her faithfulness cause them tension, and may result in her going astray.
473	7	"Peak Week"	August 5, 2009
As the cast's romantic and sexual explorations in Cancun continue, Jasmine sees Pat, but is frustrated by his seeming disinterest in her, and the attention he pays to Jonna. During Peak Week, the cast's responsibilities intensifies as 70% of U.S. universities are on Spring Break, and they are assigned to manage the band LMFAO, but Joey misses another shift, and is fired and sent home.
474	8	"Settling DIF-ferences"	August 12, 2009
As the cast deals with Joey's abrupt departure, they are assigned to raise money to help Desarrollo Integral de la Familia (Integral Family Development), or DIF, a Cancun welfare shelter for abused children. Jonna and Pat become closer, and a devastated Jasmine, whose romantic interest was not reciprocated by Pat, reacts with excessive drinking and emotional outbursts towards the others. Tardiness among the cast continues to be an issue with their boss, Christina.
475	9	"The Love Square"	August 19, 2009
As Jonna becomes closer to Pat, and more distant from Matt, Jasmine becomes closer to Pat's cousin, J.R., but this is perceived by the others as a futile attempt to make Pat jealous, and a source of awkwardness. Bronne's drunken shenanigans get him evicted from the hotel. He subsequently moves into the Grand Royal Lagoon hotel (GRL), used by Student City as its staff residence.
476	10	"Three's A Crowd"	August 26, 2009
As Jonna experiences second thoughts about her decision to break up with Matt, in part due to Pat's impending return to Toronto, the love square created by her, Pat, Jasmine and J.R. continues to generate tension. Ayiiia enjoys a visit from two of her friends, and expresses a strong attraction to Jonna, which leads to the two of them making out, and a menage a trois that includes Pat. Jonna and Ayiiia's secrecy about this causes Emilee to feel excluded, and the incident has deleterious effects on Ayiiia's relationship with her boyfriend, Ryan.
477	11	"Love Bites"	September 2, 2009
As Spring Break comes to an end, and Student City's staff prepares to return home, the women become irritated with Jonna, whom they think goes too far in her need for attention from others, particularly men. A brush with the law nearly derails the men's trip to Las Vegas, where CJ tries out for the NFL. Emilee incurs Bronne's wrath by disrespecting his property. Bronne and CJ play a running prank on Joey, who returns at the end of the episode.
478	12	"¡Adios Cancun!"	September 9, 2009
In the season finale, the cast prepares to move out, and is surprised by a visit from Joey. He and Ayiiia mend fences, as do Bronne and Emilee. Joey and Ayiiia have sex, much to everyone's shock, including their own, and both parties immediately regret it. Jonna and the other women discuss her relationship with them. As the castmates part one by one, they share emotional exchanges, and reflect upon their time together.

== After filming ==
The Real World: Cancun Reunion aired on September 16, 2009, and was hosted by Maria Menounos. Since filming ended, CJ planned to pursue his football dreams as well as a possible TV show in Miami, Derek and Jonna returned to working together in Phoenix, though Jonna stated that they planned to move to California and she planned to pursue fashion. Ayiiia, who stated that she entered a serious relationship with another woman, enjoyed time living with her mother in San Diego, though she planned to move into a house of her own. Emilee planned to move to New York City with Jasmine, and stated that she no longer works for Hooters, while Joey returned to Boston and continued to play shows with his band. Jasmine returned to Houston and continued to pursue professional cheerleading and teaching.

The cast discussed how their lives changed following the conclusion of their experience, Joey's sexual dalliance with Ayiiia in the season finale, and some of the arguments that took place among the cast. An upset Emilee briefly left the set, and then returned and argued with Joey over her singling out the men for their behavior. Jonna's flirtatious behavior, and her relationship with Pat were also discussed, as was Jasmine's feelings for him. Derek and Bronne's close friendship was discussed. Joey left the reunion early due to a prior commitment with his band. Ayiiia's romantic and sexual encounters with her female roommates were discussed. Ayiiia and Jonna explained that they are not close, due to differences that developed between them during filming. LMFAO make a special appearance on the reunion set, and concluded the reunion with a performance of their newest single "La La La".

On December 23, 2015, Jasmine welcomed her first daughter, Madelyn Eva, followed by her first son in January 2018. On August 3, 2016, Jonna gave birth to a daughter, Naleigh J. She got married in 2019 and welcomed her first son in the following year.

In 2011, Joey Rozmus appeared on the movie Living Will.

CJ Koegel is a model and a personal trainer. On September 13, 2019, he married fellow trainer Bree Branker. In 2020, their first son was born.

Emilee Fitzpatrick made her acting debut in the 2020 movie Habitual, which also featured CT Tamburello from The Real World: Paris and Sabrina Kennedy from Real World: Go Big or Go Home.

=== The Challenge ===
Cast member	Seasons of The Challenge	Other appearances
Ayiiia Elizarraras	Cutthroat (2010)	—N/a
Bronne Bruzgo	—N/a	—N/a
CJ Koegel	Fresh Meat II, Battle of the Seasons (2012)	—N/a
Derek Chavez	Cutthroat (2010), Battle of the Seasons (2012), Rivals II, Battle of the Eras, Vets & New Threats	The Challenge All Stars (season 2), The Challenge: All Stars (season 4)
Emilee Fitzpatrick	Cutthroat (2010), Free Agents	—N/a
Jasmine Reynaud	Rivals, Battle of the Exes, Battle of the Seasons (2012), Rivals II, Free Agents	The Challenge: All Stars (season 2), The Challenge: All Stars (season 4)
Joey Rozmus	—N/a	—N/a
Jonna Mannion	Rivals, Battle of the Seasons (2012), Rivals II, Free Agents, Battle of the Exes II, Battle of the Eras, Vets & New Threats	The Challenge: All Stars (season 1), The Challenge: All Stars (season 2), The Challenge: All Stars (season 3), The Challenge: All Stars (season 5), The Challenge: World Championship; The Challenge: USA (season 2)

Note: Jonna Mannion was originally cast for Fresh Meat II, but did not compete due to a lost passport.
