= Haley Carter =

American soccer player (born 1984)

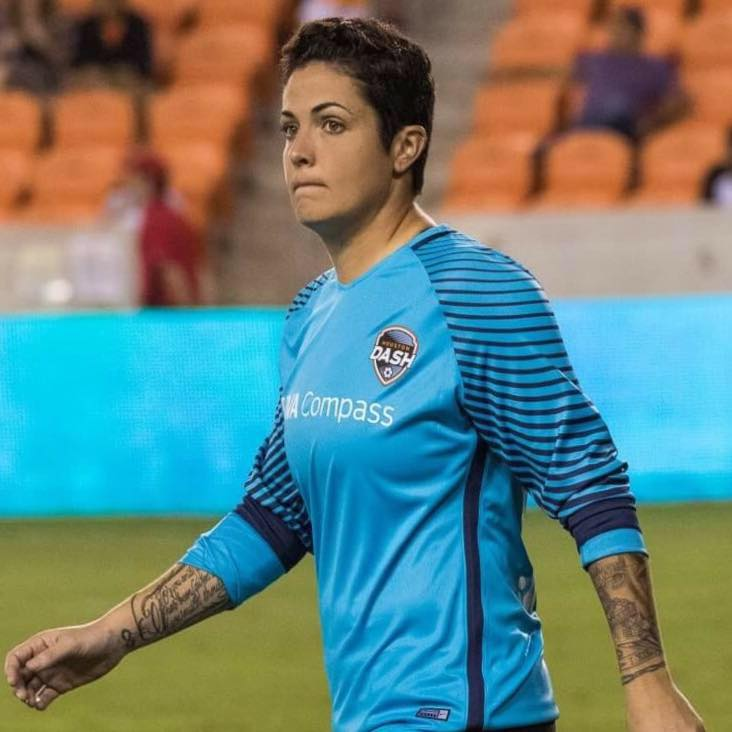
- Carter with the Houston Dash, August 2016

Personal information
- Full name: Haley Crain Carter
- Date of birth: June 21, 1984 (age 42)
- Place of birth: Friendswood, Texas, United States
- Height: 5 ft 10 in (1.78 m)
- Position: Goalkeeper

College career
Years	Team	Apps	(Gls)
2002–2005	Navy Midshipmen	27	(0)

Senior career*
Years	Team	Apps	(Gls)
2013–2016	Houston Dash	0	(0)

Managerial career
- 2014–2015: Huston–Tillotson University (assistant)
- 2015–2016: Sam Houston State University (assistant)
- 2016–2018: Afghanistan (assistant)
- 2019: University of Houston (assistant)
- 2019–2021: Antigua and Barbuda (goalkeeper coach)
- * Club domestic league appearances and goals

Haley Carter (née Crain; born June 21, 1984) is a former United States Marine Corps officer and retired American professional soccer player. She is currently the president of soccer operations for Washington Spirit of the National Women's Soccer League (NWSL).

She was formerly the sporting director and vice president of soccer operations for Orlando Pride of the National Women's Soccer League, assistant coach for the Afghanistan women's national team, and goalkeeper coach for the Antigua and Barbuda women's national team.

== Early life ==
Born and raised in Friendswood, Texas, Carter competed in three Texas high school state championships and was the starting goalkeeper of the Friendswood High School 2001 Texas 4A UIL State High School Championship team. After graduating from high school in 2002, Carter played four years of NCAA Division I Women's Soccer at the United States Naval Academy. Following her time at Navy, she spent nearly eight years in the United States Marine Corps and made multiple combat deployments in support of Operation Iraqi Freedom.

== Playing career ==
While serving on active duty in the Marine Corps, Carter represented the United States in two International Military Sports Council Women's Military World Soccer Championships (Ede, Netherlands – 2008, Cherbourg-Octeville, 2010). In 2010, Carter was named Marine Corps Air Station Cherry Point Female Athlete of the Year and finalist for the United States Marine Corps Female Athlete of the Year. From 2010 to 2013, Carter was stationed in Hawaii and played semi-professionally for the Honolulu Bulls W1 Women's team, where she was teammates with future professional player Caprice Dydasco. Upon the end of her active service in 2013, Carter returned to Texas and spent the next three years as a reserve goalkeeper for the Houston Dash in the National Women's Soccer League. She made her only bench appearance for the team against the Washington Spirit on August 18, 2016, but did not feature in the match.

== Coaching career ==
While playing at Houston, Carter also served as a volunteer assistant coach for the women's soccer programs at Huston–Tillotson University and Sam Houston State University. She has served not only as assistant coach for the Afghanistan women's national football team but also as an Olympic Development coach for South Texas Youth Soccer Association and the South Region (formerly Region III) of the United States Youth Soccer Association. On November 10, 2016, Carter became the first female professional player to receive the FIFPro World Players Union Merit Award for her efforts coaching the Afghanistan women. She used these funds to cover the teams expenses and participation in the 2016 South Asia Football Federation Women's Championships. During 2017, the team did not participate in any formal events due to budget constraints. They attended their first training camp of 2018 in Amman, Jordan, where they played two games against the Jordanian Women's National Team.

In November 2018, Carter and Afghanistan National Team head coach, Kelly Lindsey, were left off the Afghanistan Football Federation's delegation for the Central Asian Football Association's Women's Championships. Their absence was accompanied by the simultaneous dismissal of multiple key players from the team, including its captain, Shabnam Mobarez. Shortly thereafter, the dismissed players released statements on social media that their dismissal was the result of a refusal to sign a player contract substantially limiting their rights as players and human beings. Carter stated that the contract forced upon the players was deemed non-negotiable by the Afghan Federation, it was unconscionable, and that she could not support asking the players to take part.

The contract has been linked to an effort to intimidate and silence the players and staff from publicly discussing allegations they made to the Afghanistan Football Federation detailing the sexual abuse of women players by male Federation members. Documentation supporting the allegations was provided to Hummel International, and on November 30, 2018, Hummel terminated their sponsorship with the Afghan Football Federation and immediately demanded the removal of its president, Kerim Kerramudin. The allegations were investigated by both the Afghanistan Attorney General, Farid Hamidi, and the FIFA Ethics Committee. As of December 9, 2018, five members of the Afghan Football Federation, including its president, were suspended indefinitely following initial inquiries. On June 8, 2019, following its investigation, FIFA announced a lifetime ban for Kerim Kerramudin and fined him 1,000,000 CHF for breaching article 23 (protection of physical and mental integrity) and article 25 (abuse of position) of the FIFA Code of Ethics. On the following day, the Afghanistan Attorney General's office also issued an arrest warrant for Kerramudin although he remains at large. The investigation of additional Afghanistan Football Federation officials is ongoing.

Following her departure from the Afghan Women's National Team, Carter was nominated to run for vice president of the United Soccer Coaches board of directors and although losing the election, was later appointed chair of the United Soccer Coaches Women Coaches Community. In October 2019, Carter joined Lisa Cole's staff for the Antigua and Barbuda Women's National Team as a goalkeeper coach at the 2020 CONCACAF Caribbean Football Union's Olympic Qualifiers.

== Management career ==
In January 2023, Carter was appointed general manager and vice president of soccer operations for Orlando Pride of the National Women's Soccer League (NWSL). She managed club operations and transactions in her role. By the end of the 2024 NWSL season, the Pride had won its first NWSL Shield and Championship.

Carter resigned in late November 2025, following the Pride's semifinals exit from the 2025 NWSL playoffs, and was subsequently announced on December 3 as the new president of soccer operations for NWSL competitors Washington Spirit, where she would oversee the club's general manager and strategic operations.

== Personal life ==
In addition to her degree from the Naval Academy, Carter earned an MBA with Distinction from the University of Liverpool and a J.D. from the University of Houston Law Center. Her military awards and decorations include the Defense Meritorious Service Medal, the Navy and Marine Corps Commendation Medal (w/ Gold Star in Lieu of Second Award), the Joint Unit Commendation Medal, Global War on Terrorism Medal, and Iraqi Campaign Medal (w/ 3 Bronze Stars). She is a Lifetime Girl Scouts member, a member of the Girl Scouts of Southwest Texas Juliette's Circle and the Girl Scouts of San Jacinto Council's 1912 Club, and volunteers in two communities in the San Jacinto Council.

In 2017, she was admitted as an EY Women Athletes Business Network Mentee and partnered with Major General Angela Salinas, USMC (Ret). She participates in multiple women's groups including the International Women's Forum, the Women Marines Association, and the Houston Association of Women Attorneys. She is also an executive board member of the Girls Academy League, Spirit of Soccer, and the U.S. Naval Academy TxGC Foundation.

Carter is also an outspoken advocate for the #VetsForGunReform campaign. On May 23, 2018, City of Houston Mayor Sylvester Turner appointed Carter to serve on his Commission Against Gun Violence, focusing on the development of policy recommendations for improving gun safety in area schools, neighborhoods, and communities. Mayor Turner then named her chair of the commission on May 31, 2018. Carter was also named to the City of Houston Women's Commission by Houston City Council in August 2021. The commission is tasked with advancing equality and equity for women in the City of Houston by identifying and addressing disparities in healthcare, employment, safety and security across communities and industries, both in Houston's public and private sectors. Carter serves on the commission's Pay Equity Committee. In recognition of her work in business, professional sports, and service to the Greater Houston community, Carter was honored as a Houston Business Journal 40 Under 40 in August 2020.

She is the namesake of the Houston Dash "Haley's Heroes" program honoring female veterans and servicemembers.

Carter was named grand marshal of the 2022 Friendswood, Texas, Independence Day parade but stepped down after a harassment campaign led by national conservative commentator Jesse Kelly, a Friendswood resident. Kelly and followers bullied city officials, criticizing Carter based on her perceived stance in favor of LGBT rights. Kelly posted a picture of Carter's son on social media.
