= Golden Parnassus =

Hotel in Cancún, Mexico

Coordinates: 21°5′31″N 86°46′8″W

The Golden Parnassus Resort and Spa is a hotel in the Hotel Zone of Cancún, Mexico.

The Golden Parnassus drew national media attention in Canada when, on April 16, 2009, it used physical force to prevent a group of 28 Canadian customers from leaving its premises, claiming that their bills had not been paid. The hotel also threatened to call police. Guests have reported having their luggage and passports taken away and being told they could not get them back unless they paid thousands of dollars.

The customers had booked their stays at the hotel through Conquest Vacations, Inc., a Canadian company which suddenly shut its doors after reportedly not having paid its creditors for a month. The customers had used vouchers from Conquest as payment at check-in.

The Toronto Star reports that customers of another resort who found themselves in a similar predicament were told by Mexico's Tourist Bureau in Toronto that hotels that had accepted vouchers from Conquest as payment at check-in were not entitled to demand payment a second time. The Star also quotes a representative of the Mexico Consumer Protection Bureau as saying that hotels may not legally retain customers' identification, such as passports.

The hotel was originally built in 1985 and was previously branded as the Jack Tar Village.

== See also ==
- List of hotels in Mexico
- List of companies of Mexico
