= Los Cabos Corridor =

Tourist area in Mexico

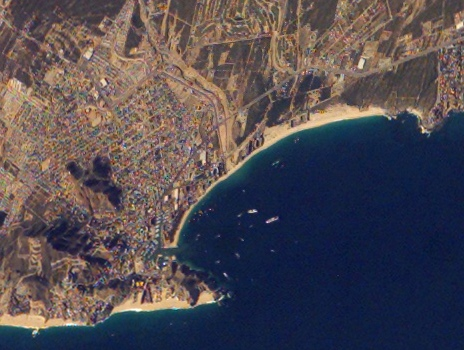
Cabo San Lucas

The Los Cabos Corridor (Spanish: Corredor Turistico, lit. 'Tourist Corridor') is a tourist area located in the Los Cabos Municipality, Baja California Sur, Mexico. It sits on the southern coast of the Baja California peninsula, facing the Gulf of California on the Transpeninsular Highway between San José del Cabo and Cabo San Lucas. It stretches about 30 km (19 mi) along the highway and addresses within this area are usually specified in terms of distances from the start of Highway 1. The corridor is considered a popular tourist destination as it has many beach resorts, golf courses, and sport fishing.

== Notable events ==
- Hurricane Marty made landfall at San José del Cabo on September 22, 2003.
- Hurricane Odile made landfall on the Los Cabos Corridor on September 14, 2014.
- The Sheraton Hacienda del Mar was the host of the 14th annual meeting of APEC, held in October 2002.
- Part of the movie Troy (2004) was filmed at Playa El Faro Viejo.

== Cabo San Lucas beaches ==
Lovers' Beach is unusual in that it opens to two seas: the Pacific side is known as "Divorce Beach."

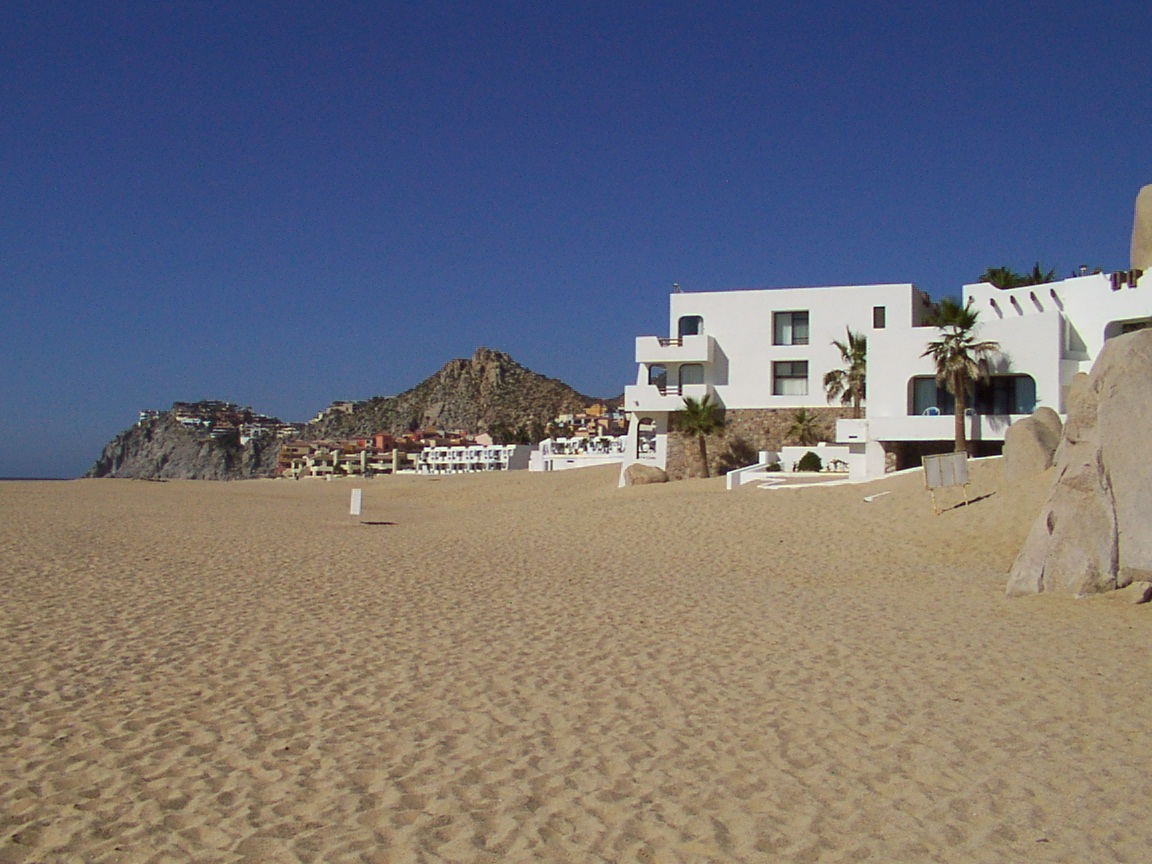
View from southern end of Playa Solmar, looking north

== See also ==
- List of companies of Mexico
- List of hotels in Mexico
