= Friendswood Independent School District =

School district in Texas, United States

Address
- 302 Laurel Drive Friendswood, Texas, 77546; United States

District information
- Grades: PK–12
- Established: 1939
- Superintendent: Thad Roher
- Schools: 6
- NCES District ID: 4819950

Students and staff
- Students: 6,210 (2023–2024)
- Teachers: 390.32 (on an FTE basis) (2023–2024)
- Staff: 376.80 (on an FTE basis) (2023–2024)
- Student–teacher ratio: 15.91 (2023–2024)

Other information
- Website: www.myfisd.com

Friendswood Independent School District is a school district based in Friendswood, Texas (USA).

FISD covers the Galveston County portion of the city of Friendswood (the portion south of Clear Creek, which is the majority of the city). A small portion of the district is in Brazoria County.

The Friendswood Independent School District was established on December 21, 1948. The district covers 15 square miles (39 km^{2}) and borders the Alvin, Pearland and Clear Creek school districts.

All of the district's school's mascots are some version of a horse.

In 2009, the school district was rated "exemplary" by the Texas Education Agency.

== Schools ==
Secondary schools

- Friendswood High School
- Friendswood Junior High School

Primary schools

- Intermediate schools
  - Bales Intermediate School
  - Windsong Intermediate School
- Elementary schools
  - Cline Elementary School
  - Westwood Elementary School
