= Melody Maker Cancún =

Hotel in Cancún, Mexico

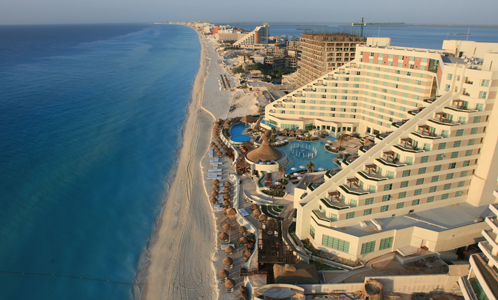
- Interactive map of the Melody Maker Cancún area
- Former names: ME Cancún (2006–2018); Meliá Turquesa (1990–2006)

General information
- Location: Hotel Zone, Cancún, Mexico
- Coordinates: 21°06′45.5″N 86°45′32.8″W
- Opened: 1990; 36 years ago
- Closed: 2019
- Operator: Be Live Hotels

Technical details
- Floor count: 11
- Floor area: 283,000 ft^{2} (26,300 m^{2})

Other information
- Number of rooms: 679
- Number of suites: 40
- Number of restaurants: 4

Website
- www.melodymakercancun.com

Melody Maker Cancún was a hotel and resort located in the Hotel Zone (Zona Hotelera) of Cancun, Mexico. The hotel is part of the Melody Maker brand name and is owned and operated by Be Live Hotels.

== History ==
Melody Maker opened in 1990 and is located in the heart of Cancún's Hotel Zone. Its original name was Meliá Turquesa before being renamed to ME Cancún in 2006. It has 11 floors and 419 rooms, including 40 suites and a total floor area of 283,000 square feet. There are also four restaurants in the hotel. It was featured in the show The Real World: Cancun (then known as ME Cancun) and is where the cast stayed throughout filming.

The property underwent extensive renovations in 2000 and 2006. In 2018, the hotel got new ownership and was renamed the Melody Maker Cancún with Miguel Bosé performing for its grand opening in front of 2,500 guests. The resort was expanded to 679 rooms. The hotel's experience was described as "Vegas-meets-Cancun" by its CEO. The hotel also featured a concert venue where musicians like Tiësto, Steve Aoki, and David Guetta have performed for spring break.

In the summer of 2019, the hotel closed due to low occupancy just one year after reopening. As of 2025, the property is still abandoned and there are no known plans to reopen it.

== See also ==
- List of hotels in Mexico
- List of companies of Mexico
- Hotel Zone, resort district where the hotel is located
