= Hotel Geneve Mexico City =

Historic hotel in Mexico City, Mexico

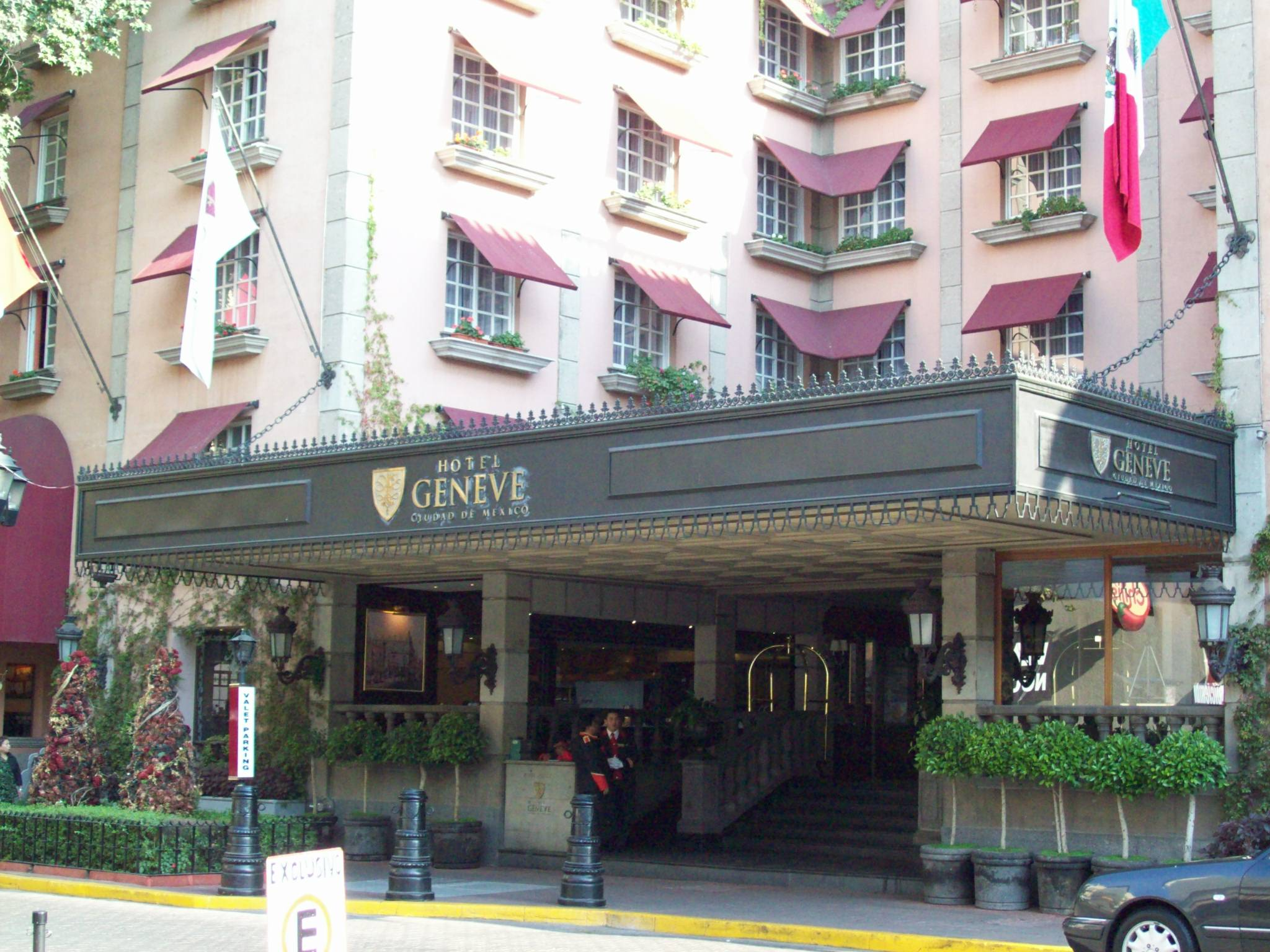
- The hotel's front exterior, 2010
- Interactive map of the Hotel Geneve Mexico City area

General information
- Location: Mexico City, Mexico
- Coordinates: 19°25′30.5″N 99°9′51″W

Hotel Geneve Mexico City is an historic hotel in Mexico City's Zona Rosa neighborhood, near Paseo de la Reforma, in Mexico. Established in 1907, the hotel's Phone Bar has a collection of antique phones, inspired by Winston Churchill's visit. The lobby features a small museum.

== Gallery ==
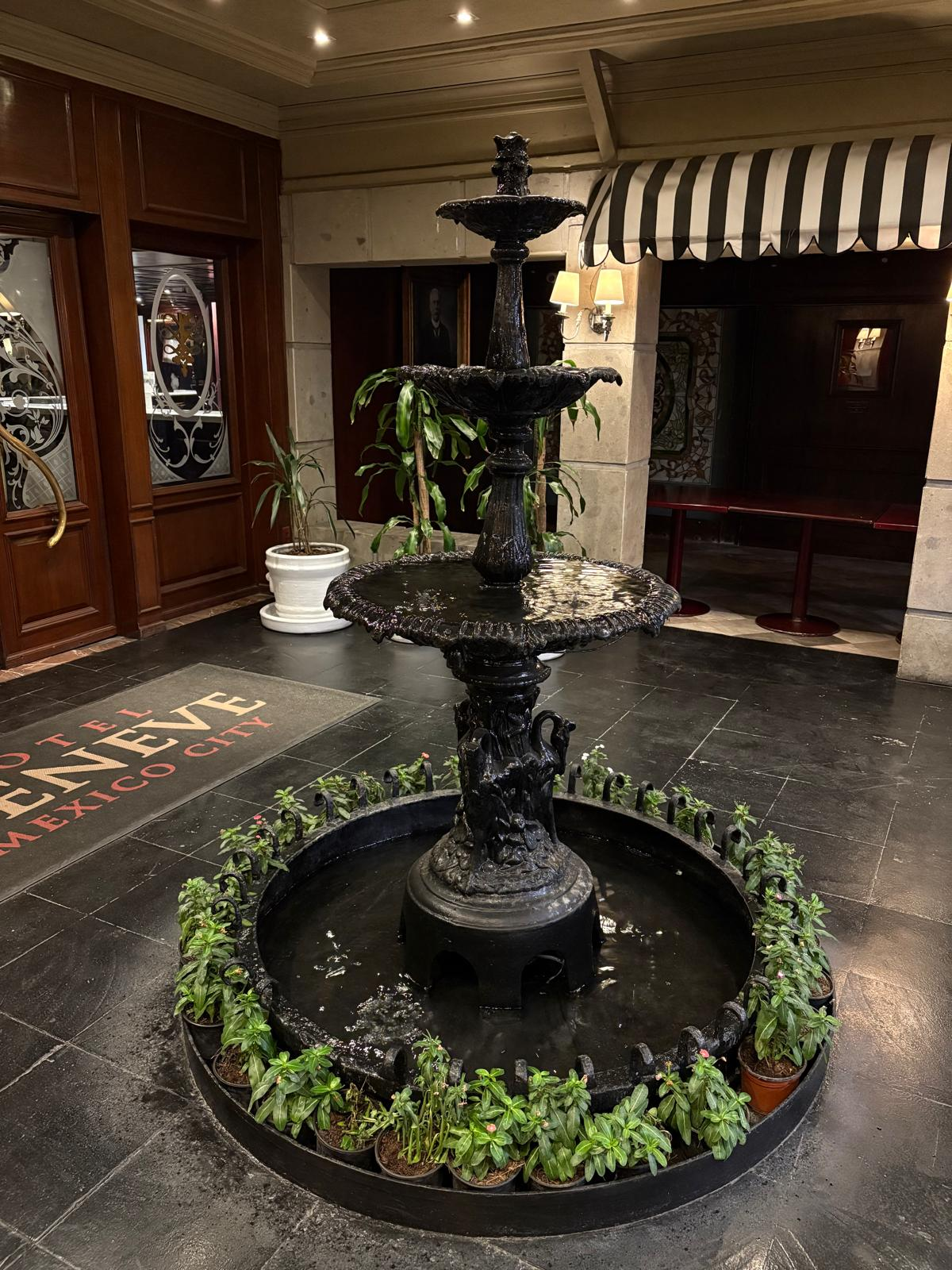
Fountain in the entrance, 2025

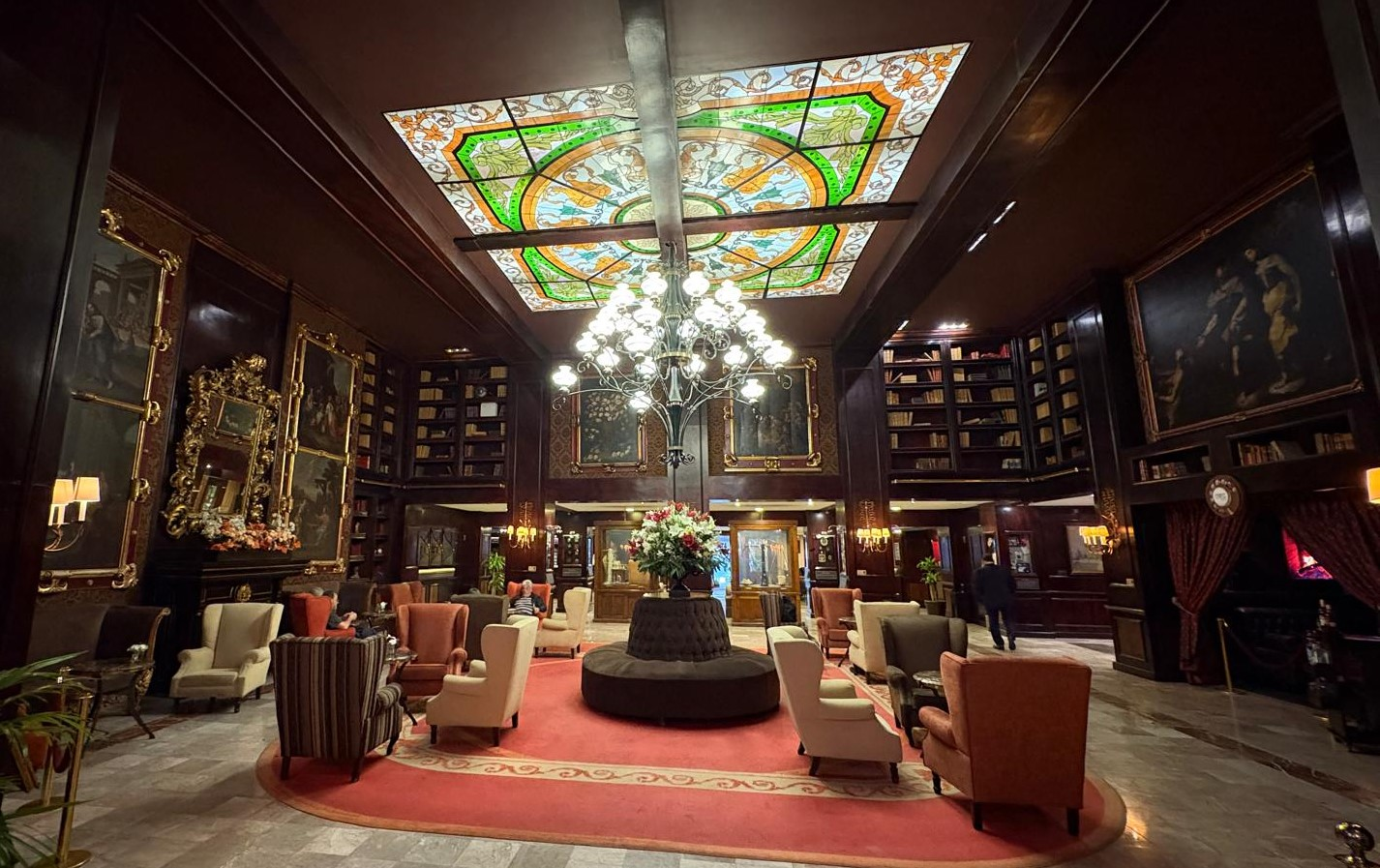
Main hall, 2025

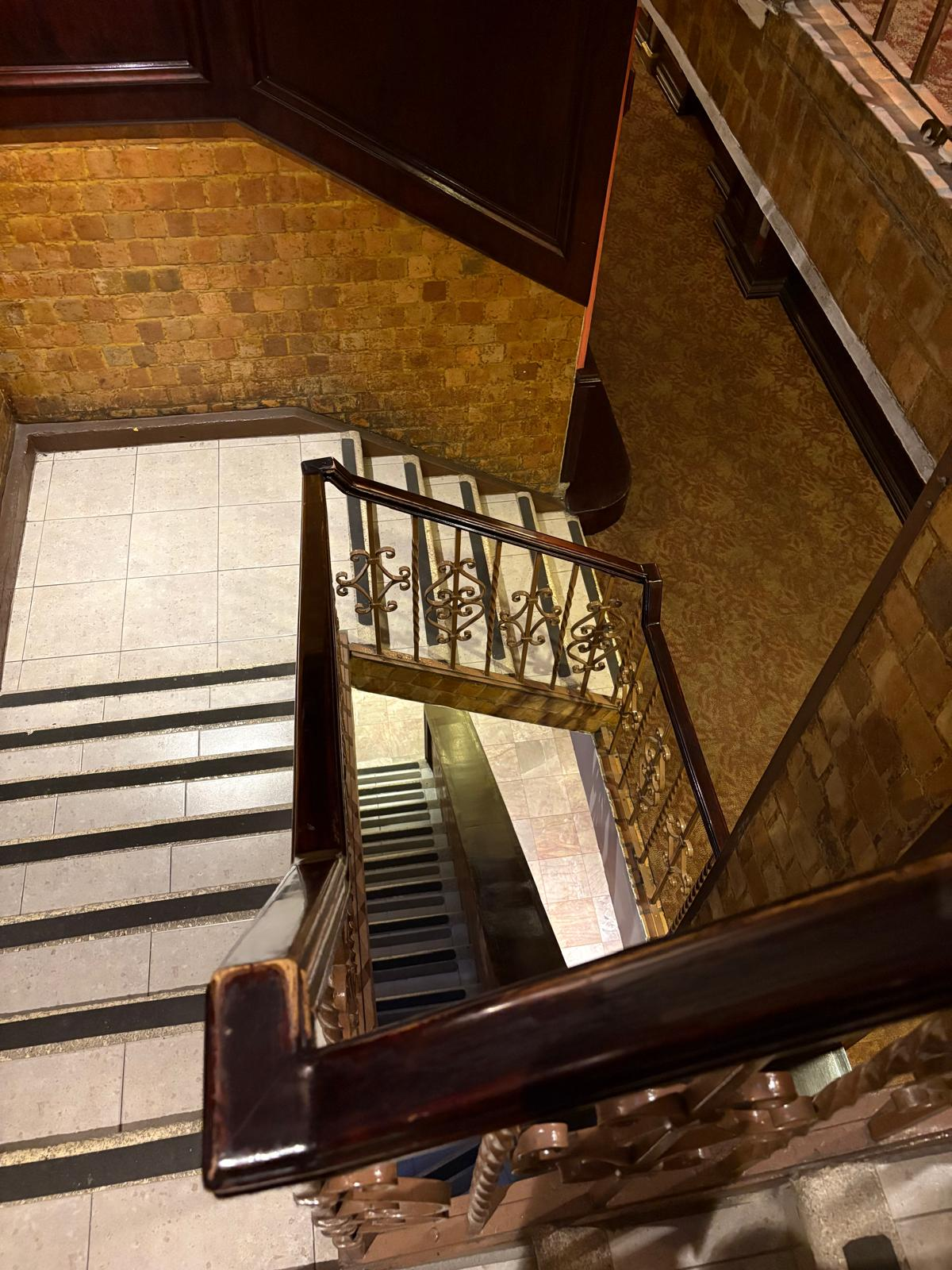
Staircase, 2025

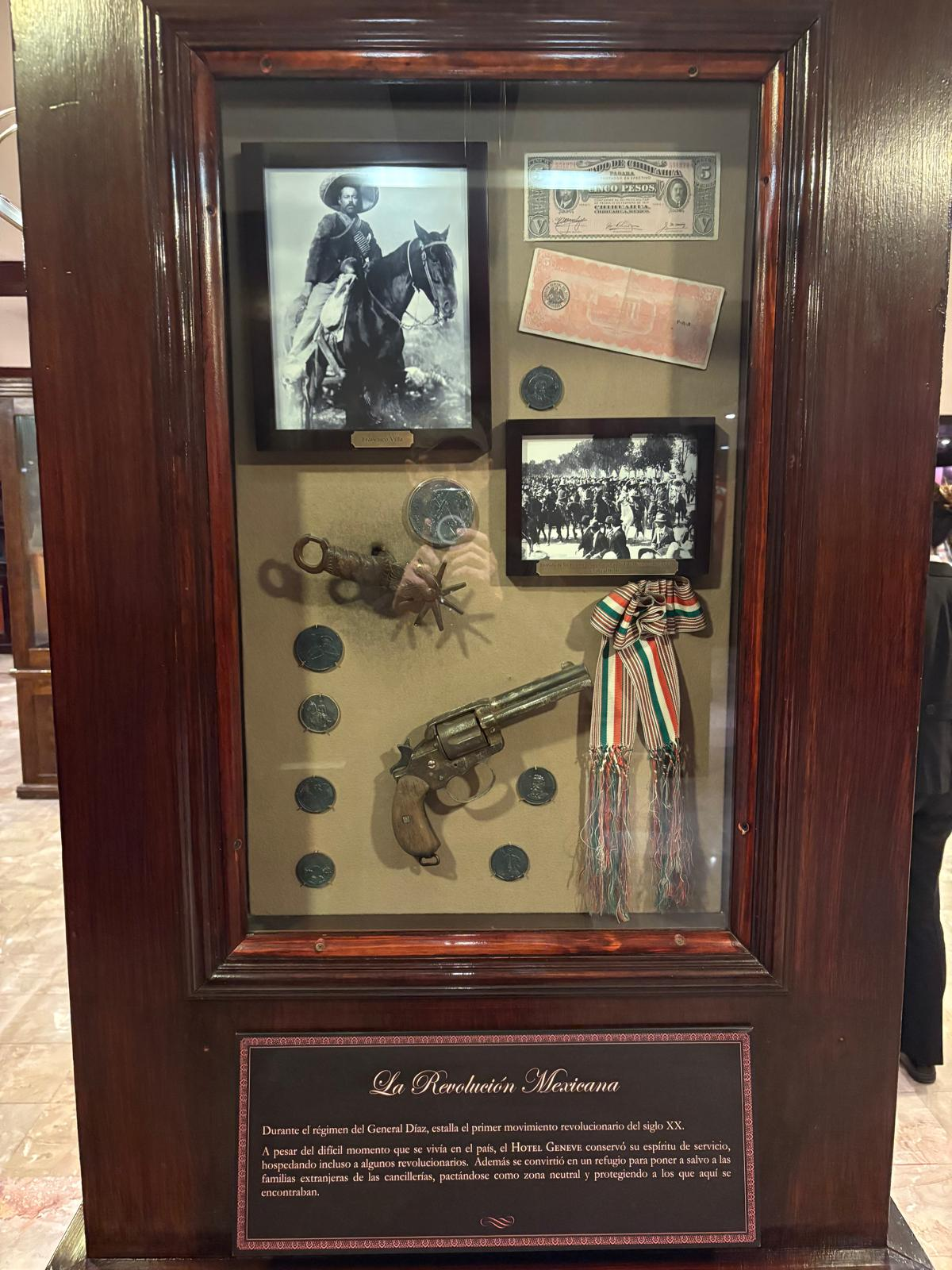
Historical collection about Mexican Revolution, 2025

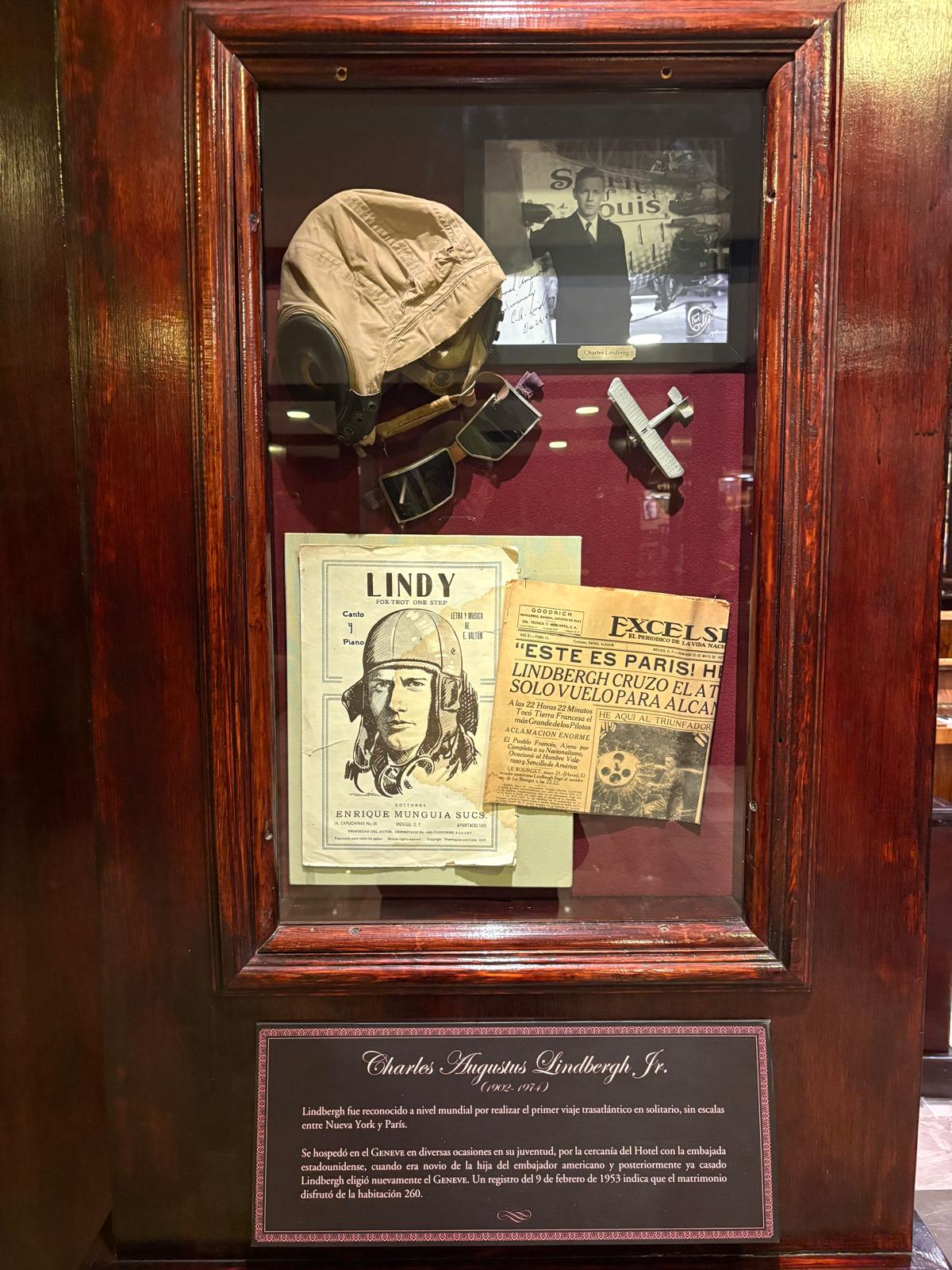
Charles Lindbergh collection, 2025

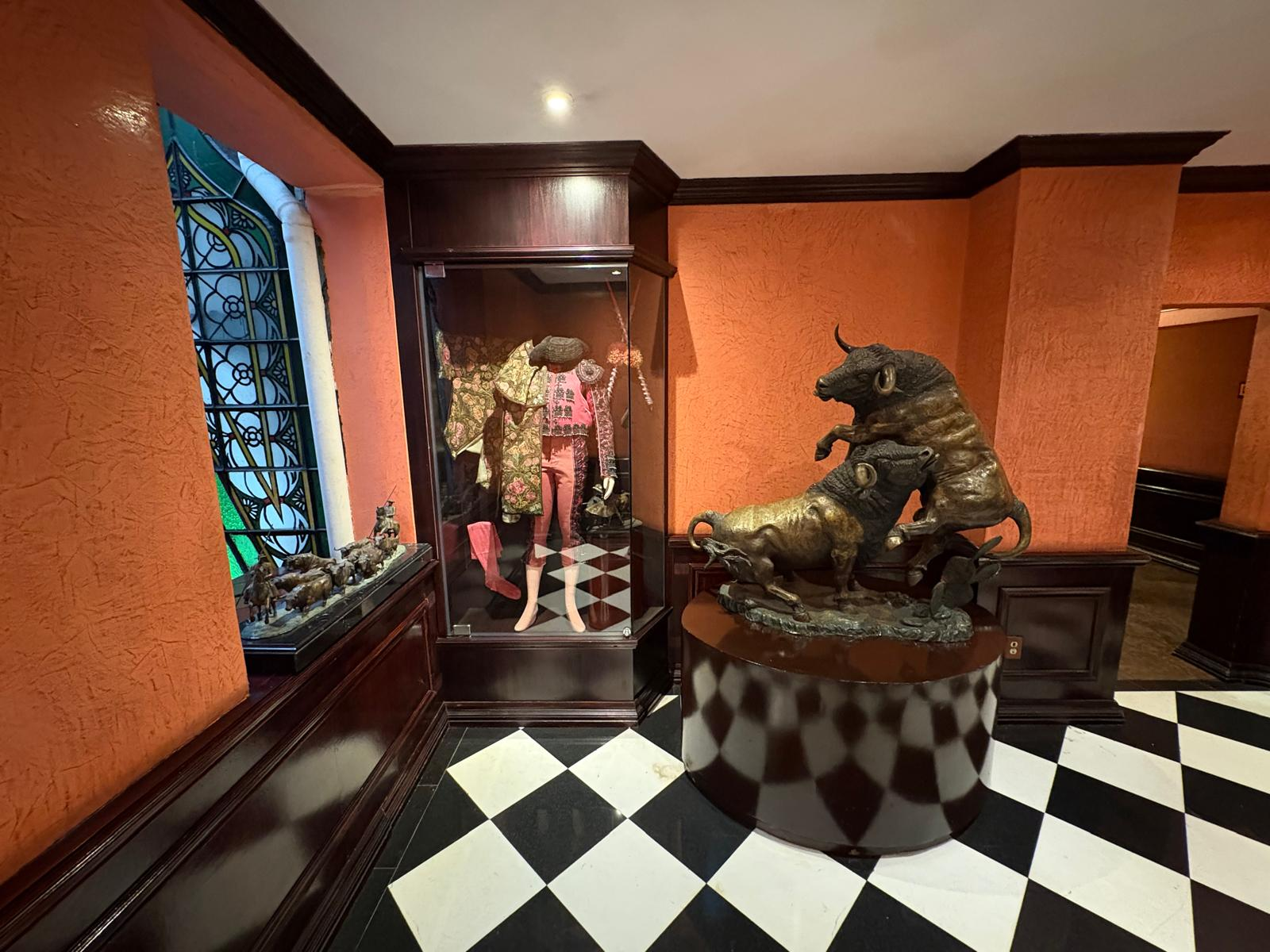
Bullfighting memoribilia, 2025

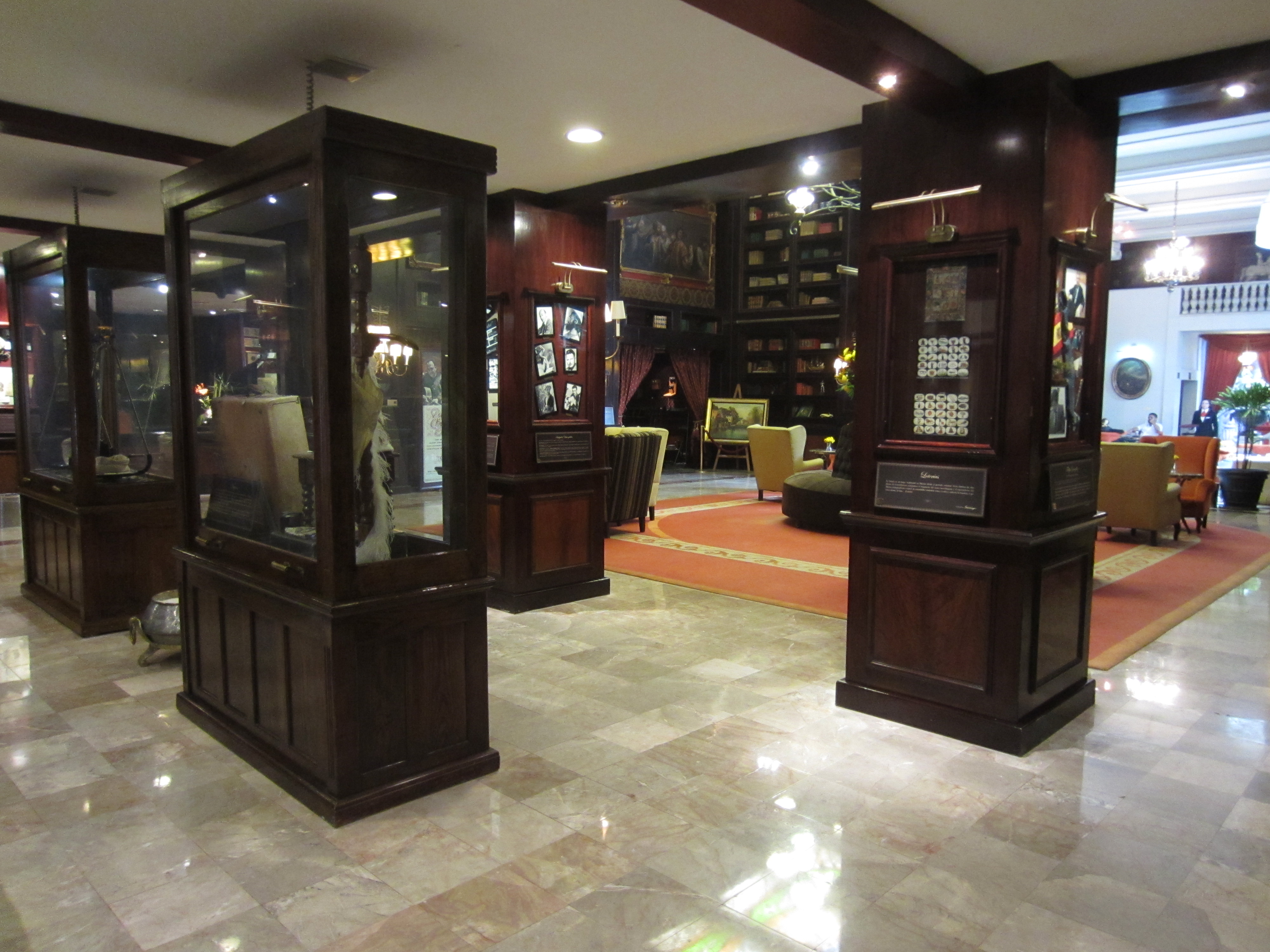
Exhibits in the hotel's lobby, 2018

Dining room circa 1950s

== See also ==
- List of hotels in Mexico
