= List of hotels in Mexico =

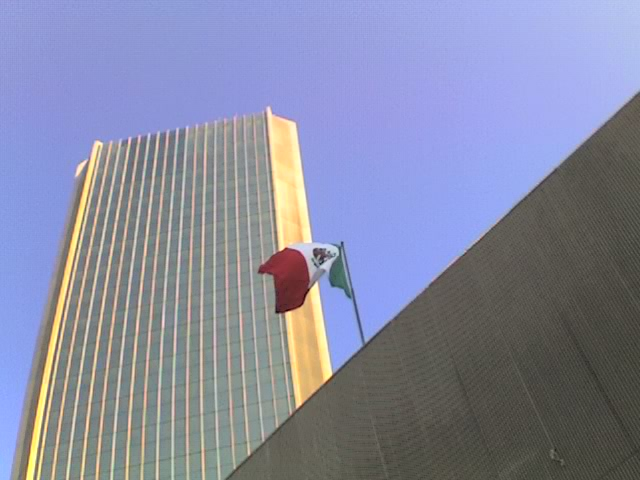
A view of the Grand Hotel Tijuana

This is a list of notable hotels in Mexico.

== Hotels in Mexico ==
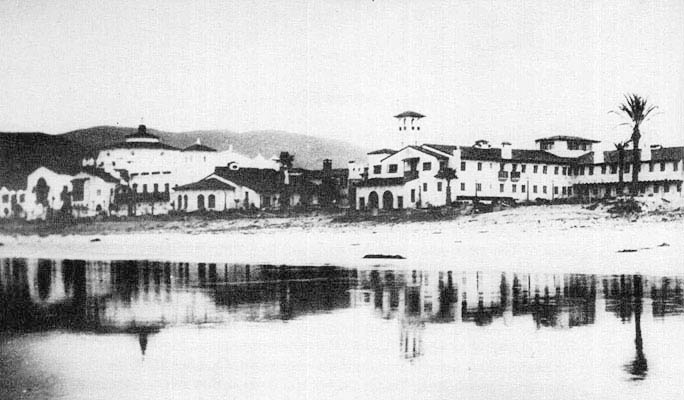
The Hotel Riviera del Pacífico at its opening in 1930

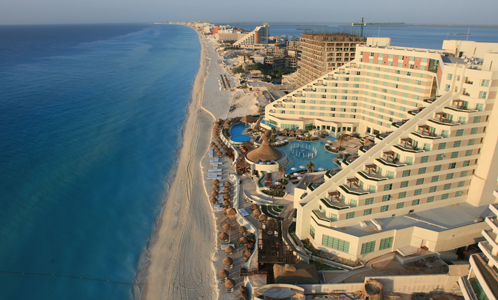
The Melody Maker Cancún in Cancun, Mexico

- Agua Caliente Casino and Hotel, Tijuana
- Bahia Principe
- Casa Na Bolom, San Cristóbal de las Casas
- Hotel Princess Mundo Imperial, Acapulco
- Golden Parnassus, Cancún
- Gran Hotel of Mexico, Mexico City
- Grand Hotel Tijuana, Tijuana
- Hacienda Santa Rosa de Lima
- Hilton Mexico City Reforma, Mexico City
- Hotel Geneve Mexico City, Mexico City
- Hotel Riviera del Pacífico, Ensenada
- Los Cabos Corridor
- Melody Maker Cancún, Cancún
- Old Portal de Mercaderes, Mexico City
- Sheraton Maria Isabel Hotel and Towers, Mexico City
- Trump Ocean Resort Baja Mexico, Tijuana
- Villa Marina Hotel, Ensenada

== See also ==
- List of companies of Mexico
- Lists of hotels – an index of hotel list articles on Wikipedia
- List of Mexican brands
