= Friendswood High School =

Location
- 702 Greenbriar; Friendswood, Texas; United States; 29.5123°N 95.2085°W

Information
- Type: Public school
- Established: 1940
- School district: Friendswood Independent School District
- Dean: Nancy Lockhart
- Principal: Mark Griffon
- Teaching staff: 131.43 (FTE)
- Grades: 9-12
- Enrollment: 1,966 (2023-2024)
- Student to teacher ratio: 14.96
- Campus: High School
- Colors: Blue and white
- Mascot: Mustang
- National ranking: 1. 1
- Yearbook: Roundup
- Website: fhs.myfisd.com

Friendswood High School is a public secondary school located in Friendswood, Texas, United States. The school serves grades 9 through 12, and is a part of the Friendswood Independent School District (ISD).

The school district was established on December 21, 1948, and covers 15 square miles (39 km^{2}). It borders the Alvin, Pearland and Clear Creek school districts.

Most of the city of Friendswood is within Friendswood ISD and is zoned to Friendswood High School. All students in Friendswood ISD public schools attend Friendswood High School.

== History ==
Previously all grades K-12 of Friendswood ISD were in a single building. In 2006 Todd Spivak of the Houston Press noted that multiple generations of the same families attended Friendswood High, and that the school had a "long-held reputation for academic excellence."

=== 2023 Roof Collapse ===
On June 23, 2023, multiple local news outlets reported that a section of the school's roof over the boy's gym had collapsed amid ongoing renovations, resulting in one death and at least three hospitalizations due to falling debris.

== Connected schools ==
All Friendswood ISD schools feed into Friendswood High School. This includes Cline and Westwood Elementaries, Zue S. Bales and Windsong Intermediate School, and Friendswood Junior High.

== Extracurricular activities ==
FHS extracurricular activities include drama and musical productions, choir, band, service organizations, and clubs. They compete in academic contests including Academic Decathlon and Octathlon, speech, debate, and competitive sports governed by the University Interscholastic League (UIL). Competing in UIL in the 2008-2009 and 2009-2010 school years won Friendswood High School the 4A Lone Star Cup both years which is a culmination of UIL Academics and UIL Sports.

== Accolades ==
Friendswood ISD has been named the fifth most efficient Texas School District by the Texas Business Coalition. Friendswood High School was named 1 of 13 Top High Schools in the State as well as 1 of 10 Top High Schools in the Houston area. The Band, Choir, Drama, and Drill Team Departments have been awarded exceptional honors annually.

== Notable alumni ==
Friendswood High School names at least three new distinguished alumni each year at a Distinguished Alumni Banquet and publishes a Military Wall of Honor for alumni who are veterans or serving as active duty members of the armed forces.

- Izaac Pacheco, Class of 2021; professional baseball player
- Karan Jerath, Class of 2015; 2016 Forbes 30 Under 30, United Nations Young Leaders for the Sustainable Development Goals (SDGs)
- Taylor Rue, Class of 2015; Netflix's Love is Blind (Season Five)
- Bunny Meyer, Class of 2003; YouTuber with over 8 million subscribers, also known as "grav3yardgirl"
- Haley Carter, Class of 2002; professional soccer player and coach
- Steven Shulz, Class of 2002; Purple Heart recipient
- Katie Rose Clarke, Class of 2001; Broadway musical theatre actress
- Steven Jamail, Class of 1998; composer, arranger and music director
- Scott Williamson, Class of 1994; former Major League Baseball pitcher for the Cincinnati Reds
- Nilofer S. Azad, Class of 1993; oncologist and professor who served on National Cancer Advisory Board
- Amy Ross, Class of 1989; space suit designer
- Chris Henchy, Class of 1982; film director, film producer, and screenwriter
- Larry Taylor, Class of 1978; Republican member of the Texas Senate from District 11 (2013–2023) and Texas House of Representatives from District 24 (2003-2013)
- Larry Speck, Class of 1967; architect and professor
