= Old Portal de Mercaderes =

Historic buildings in Mexico

Coordinates: 19°25′57.51″N 99°8′3.77″W

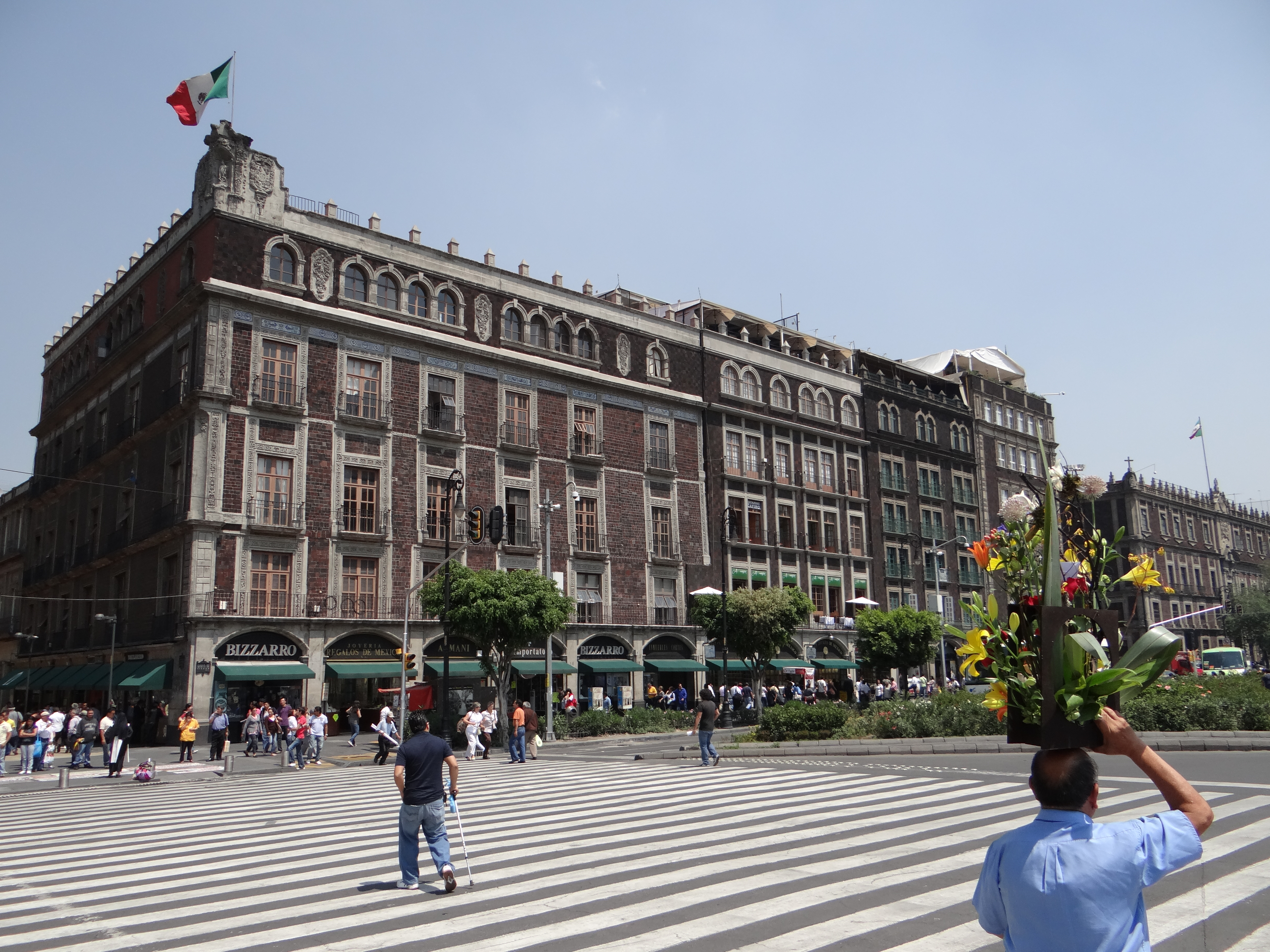
View of west side of Zocalo

Old Portal de Mercaderes in the historic center of Mexico City was and is the west side of the main plaza (otherwise known as the "Zócalo"). This side of the plaza has been occupied by commercial structures since the Spanish Conquest of the Aztec Empire in 1521. Today the west side of the square is dominated by two sets of buildings with Madero Street dividing them as it runs west from the Zocalo to the Palace of Bellas Artes. The buildings on the north side of Madero is occupied by offices on the upper floors and shops at ground level. The southside buildings are dominated on the ground floor by fine jewelry stores, marking the beginning of the "Centro Joyero Zocalo." This center extends west for two block engulfing Palma Street between Madero and 16 de Septiembre streets. Most of the upper floors of the buildings here are occupied by rooms associated with the Hotel de Ciudad de Mexico and the Hotel Majestic.

== Old Portal de Mercaderes ==
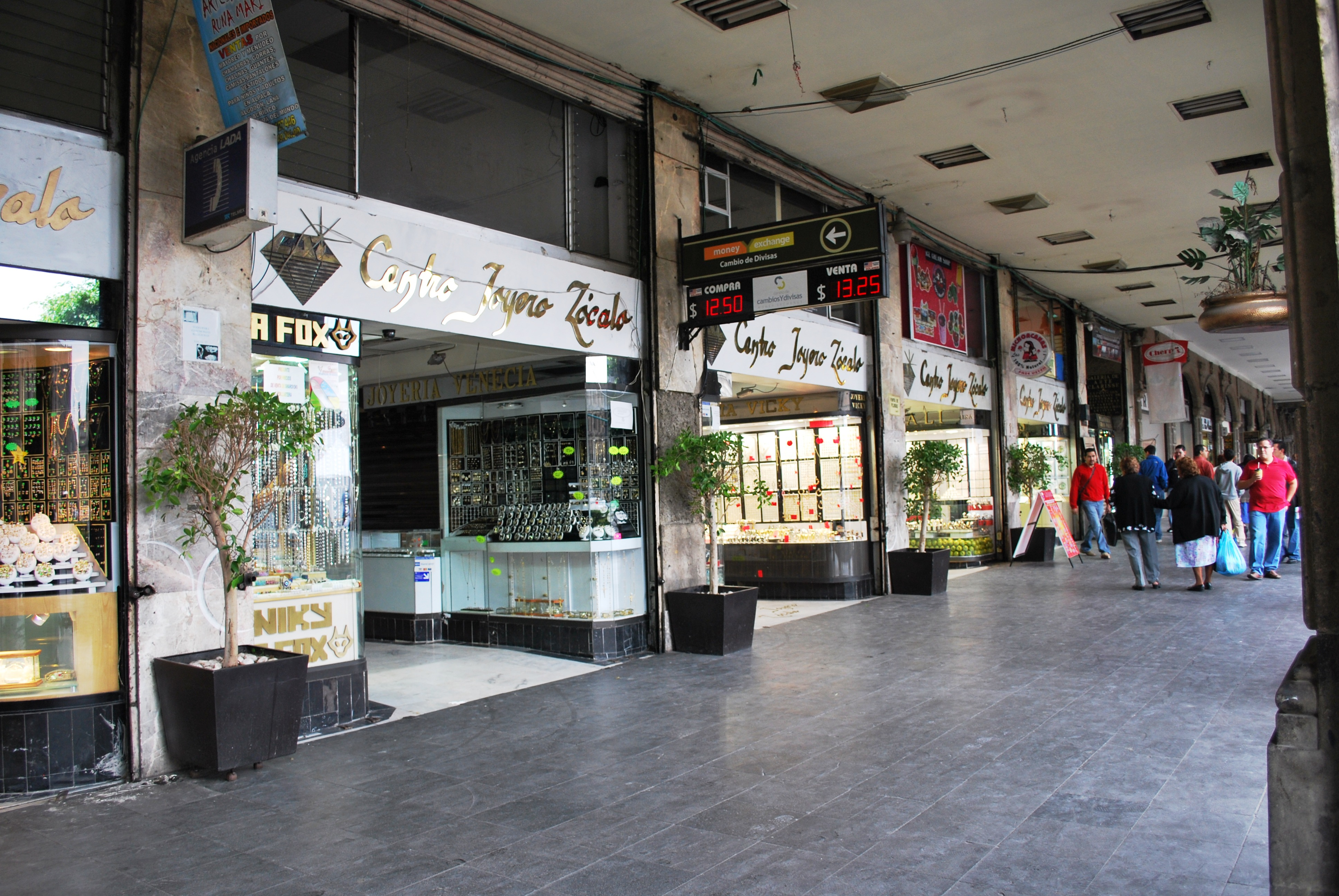
Part of the Centro Joyero

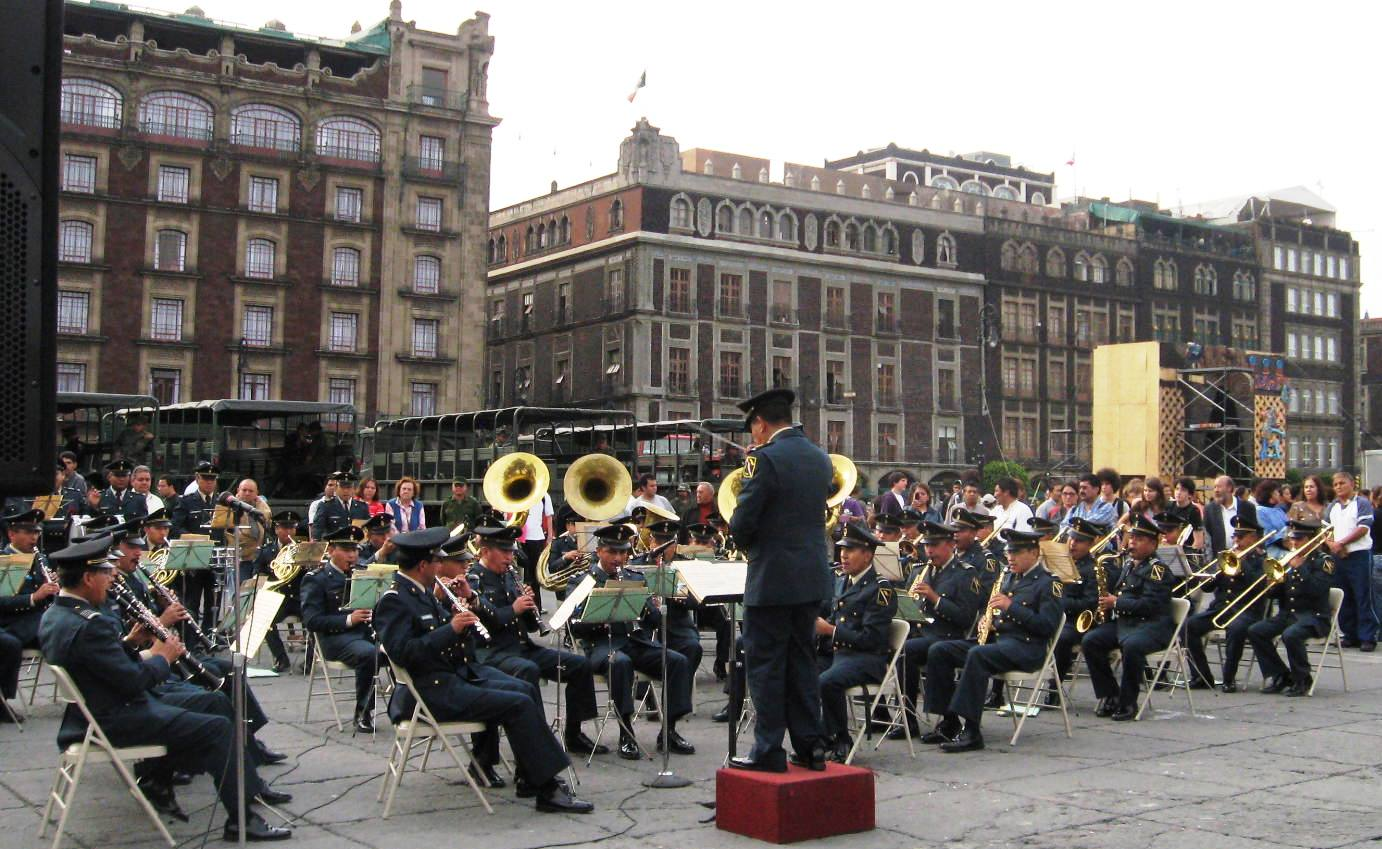
Mexican military band playing on Zocalo in front of the commercial buildings of the west side.

The first colonial building was built on this side of the square by Melchor Davila, dedicated to selling food and other merchandise. From this building stretched street vendors west and as far north as Santo Domingo. Much of the land here was granted to Don Rodrigo de Albornoz, Count of Santiago, secretary to King Carlos V and named the accountant for New Spain. In 1524, the city council passed an ordinance stating that the owners of property fronting the Zocalo could build covered archways in front of their establishments on city land and rent the space to merchants. The reason for this ordinance was that the Zocalo still had severe flooding problems at this time. These covered archways would provide an alternative to the open Zocalo, especially during the rainy season.

Much, but not all, of the west side of the Zocalo was owned by Albornoz, including the portion at the southwest corner of the plaza, near the city council building. It was nearly impossible to build covered archways here because of a gully running very close to the facade of the houses here. Albornoz made an arrangement with the city; the city would install better drainage for this corner of the Zocalo, and Albornoz would build the covered archways for the entire west side of the plaza. The task was completed in 1529. The resulting archway ran almost the entire side of the Zocalo, covering what is now Madero and 16 de Septiembre Streets. Through all of the colonial period into the post-Independence period, the west side was known as the Portal de Mercaderes. In 1629, massive flooding in the Zocalo required almost all of the portals surrounding the plaza to be rebuilt. The Portal was again reconstructed in the mid 18th century by one of Albornoz heirs. During the 17th century, this area mostly sold silk and brocade cloth as well as fruit and medicinal herbs. In the 19th century, hat shops established themselves here, and other vendors attached shelving onto the arches' columns to sell toys. At night, the archway would sell candy to those taking walks the area.

In the mid nineteenth century, the Portal was divided into two with the opening of Plateros street, now Madero. This essentially ended the Portal being considered a single entity.

From the beginning of the colonial period, the Zocalo and the area west has been an area covered in vendors’ stalls. The building of the covered archways did not work to regulate commercial activity here. Even though the arches were built by property owners, the city still owned the land on which the arches stood. This led to disputes over maintenance and over who should control the vendors. Taking advantage of the ambiguous situation, many peddlers set up shop, sometimes permanently, all over the archways, into the street and into the Zocalo itself. This would be a constant issue for both the Portal and the Zocalo area in general, with the occasional attempt to clear out ambulatory vendors and other unregulated selling. However, these sellers would reappear again as the effort to keep them out waned, a problem what would repeat itself again and again over the history of the downtown. This problem was again tackled in the 1990s as part of an effort to revitalize the historic center of Mexico City. Despite much initial resistance, this area has been free of street peddlers since that time, with the west side of the Zocalo now dominated by jewelry shops that are located in the first floor of the buildings.

Most of the buildings now on the west side were built over the last century or so. Starting in the late 1950s, the facades of these privately owned buildings facing the Zocalo began to be regularized to a neocolonial style, using tezontle (and blood red volcanic rock) and cantera (a greyish-white stone)to match the Federal District Buildings and the National Palace.

On the portion south of Madero Street, what appears to be one building is actually two. They are mostly occupied by two major hotels, the former Hotel Majestic (now Best Western) and the Gran Hotel de la Ciudad de Mexico (now Howard Johnson). Both buildings date from the late 19th and early 20th centuries and both hotels tend to still be called by their original names.

== Hotel Majestic ==
The Hotel Majestic takes up most of the building visible from the Zocalo, although its entrance is on Madero Street. Parts of this building date from the 18th century, but was completely renovated by architect Rafael Goyeneche in 1925 and most of the interior dates from that year. The Hotel Majestic itself opened in 1937. The facade facing the Zocalo is done in neocolonial style that was ordered by the government to have all of the buildings of the Zocalo match in style. The hotel has a large number of rooms that face the Zocalo as well as a rooftop restaurant that overlooks it. The Hotel Majestic is now owned by Best Western.

== Gran Hotel Ciudad de México ==
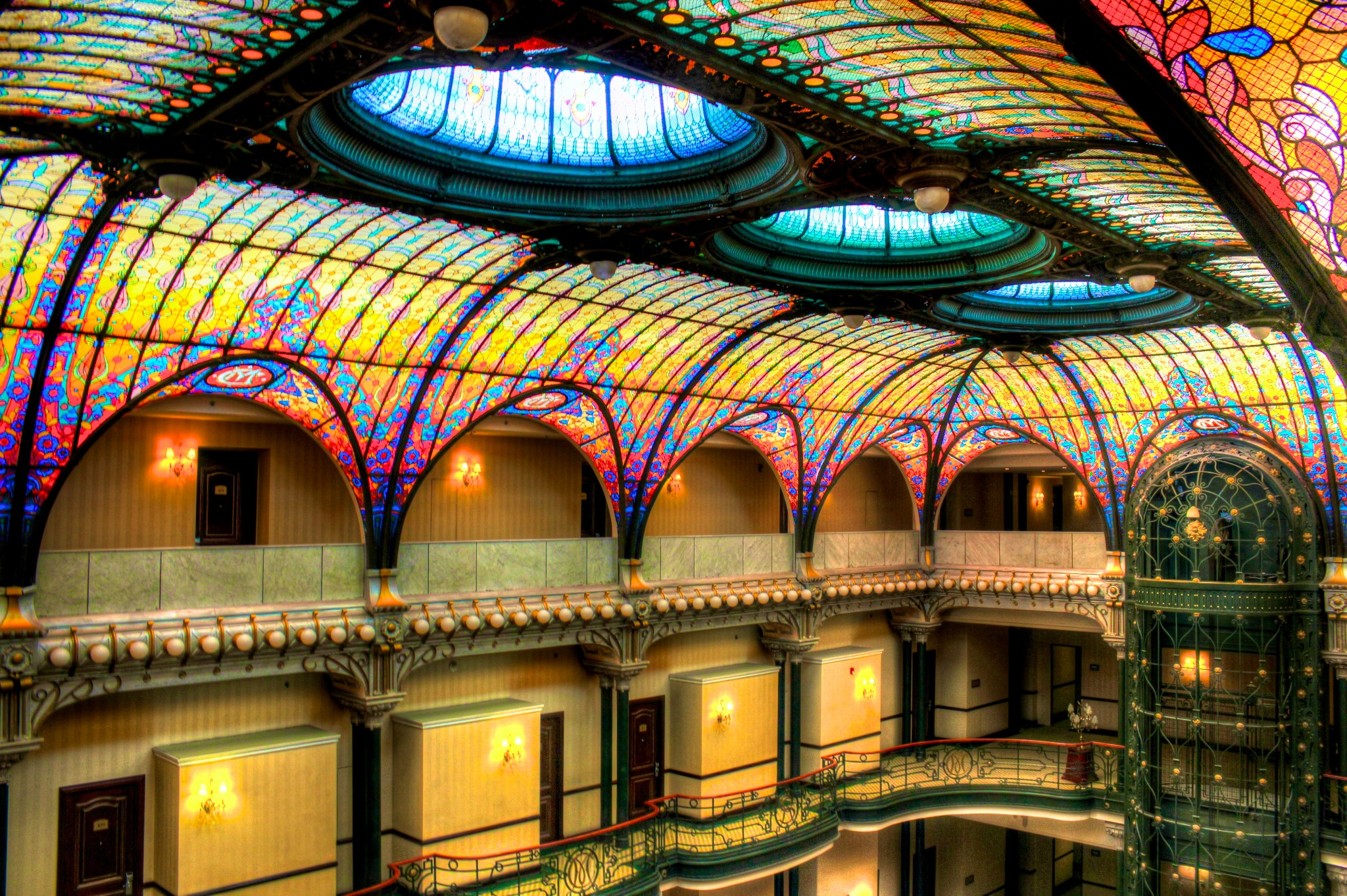
The Gran Hotel Ciudad de México interior, built in 1918 by Jacques Grüber.

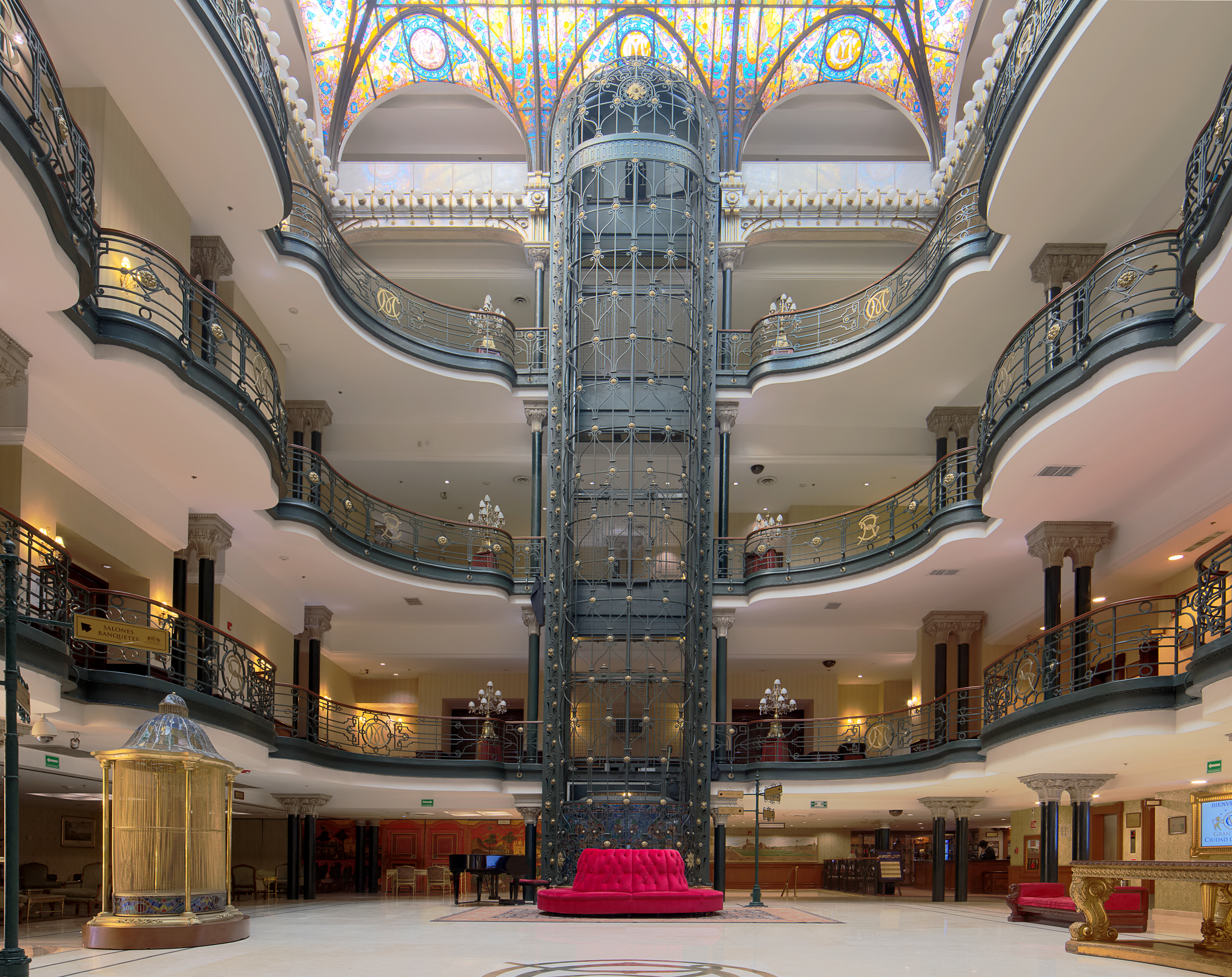
Elevator and floors with balconies inside the hotel.

The Gran Hotel occupies the extreme southern end of this side, and while it appears to be the same building as that which contains the Hotel Majestic, in reality it is separate. This building came into being as the "Mercantile Center" in 1899, built for José de Teresa, a merchant and ambassador of Mexico to Austria. At the end of the 19th century, Mexico made strides to modernize; one way of doing this was by introducing new building techniques. It was the first building built using the "Chicago" technique, using iron and concrete and was home to one of the first department stores in Mexico City. Its entrance and façade is located on 16 de Septiembre and not the Zócalo. For that reason, its façade is the original Neoclassical and not the neocolonial mandated by the government to unify the appearance of the Zócalo. Only the side of the building facing the Zócalo itself has been redone in this fashion.

The interior of the hotel maintains most of the original decor created for when it was a department store. It is decorated lavishly in the Art Nouveau style. It had an undulating and enveloping stairway, which was a replica of the one from the Au Bon Marché store in Paris, but it was lost in 1966. However, the cage-like elevators and the stained-glass ceiling designed by French artisan Jacques Grüber are all originals. The pattern of the glass ceiling is meant to evoke the railroad, at that time the symbol of modernity. At the center of the domed glass are three medallions.

The building was converted to a hotel in 1968 to accommodate crowds attending the 1968 Summer Olympics. It has been featured in multiple films, including the James Bond films Licence to Kill and Spectre and the Palme d'Or-winning political drama Missing, in which it doubles for the Hotel Carrera in Santiago.

== See also ==
- List of hotels in Mexico
