= Friendswood (novel) =

- First edition
- Language: English
- Publisher: Riverhead Books
- Publication date: 2014

Friendswood is a 2014 novel by René Steinke. It is about an incident of dumping toxic waste in Friendswood, Texas. Riverhead Books is the publisher. The waste site featured in the book never was located in Friendswood and has never been under the jurisdiction of Friendswood.

The novel's plot involves a superfund site that is based on the real Brio Superfund site in the South Belt area, located in an unincorporated area in Harris County. The author, who lived in Brooklyn in 2014, originated from and was raised in Friendswood. The author stated that she "wanted to write about the particular textures of Friendswood itself—the Quaker church in the center of town, the humidity and heat, the local Mexican restaurant, the country music I heard so often in the background." She added that "The Friendswood in the novel is fictional. I was more interested in creating the essence of the place than its actual, factual geography."

In 2014 Elizabeth Fowler, Susan Duff, and Dannielle Thomas obtained the rights to make a film version of Friendswood.
