= Friendswood, Texas =

- City
- Location in Galveston and Harris counties in the state of Texas
- Coordinates: 29°30′45″N 95°11′53″W
- Country: United States
- State: Texas
- Counties: Galveston and Harris
- Incorporated: 1960

Government
  - Type: Council manager
  - City Council: Mayor Michael Foreman; John Elllisor; Sally Branson; Trish Hanks; Robert Griffon; Joe Matranga; Michael Ross
  - City manager: Morad Kabiri

Area
  - Total: 20.90 sq mi (54.13 km^{2})
  - Land: 20.76 sq mi (53.76 km^{2})
  - Water: 0.14 sq mi (0.37 km^{2})
- Elevation: 30 ft (9.1 m)

Population (2020)
  - Total: 41,213
  - Density: 1,986/sq mi (766.6/km^{2})
- Time zone: UTC-6 (CST)
  - Summer (DST): UTC-5 (CDT)
- ZIP codes: 77546, 77549
- Area codes: 281/346/621/713/832
- FIPS code: 48-27648
- GNIS feature ID: 1336252
- Website: ci.Friendswood.TX.us

Friendswood is a city in the U.S. state of Texas. It is part of the Greater Houston metropolitan area. The city lies in Galveston and Harris counties. As of the 2020 census, the population of Friendswood was 41,213.

== History ==
Friendswood, situated in the northwestern corner of Galveston County, has the distinction of being the only permanent town in Texas that started as a Quaker colony. It was established in 1895 by a group of Quakers led by T. Hadley Lewis and Frank J. Brown. They were looking for a "promised land" to start a colony of the people who belonged to the religious denomination called Friends or Quakers.

From its founding, life in Friendswood revolved around church and school. After the small church and school building was demolished in the 1900 Storm, the two-dozen families living in Friendswood erected a large two-story frame structure for their church and school. The building, called The Academy, housed the school and sanctuary until a larger, stone building replaced it.

Through the 1940s, Friendswood was predominately a small, remote, farming Quaker community with less than 500 citizens. The economy depended largely on growing and preserving Magnolia figs. After 1950, it became increasingly a suburban bedroom community, as Houstonians discovered the idyllic country setting the farmlands were converted to subdivision home-sites. The community became a city when it incorporated in 1960.

== Geography ==
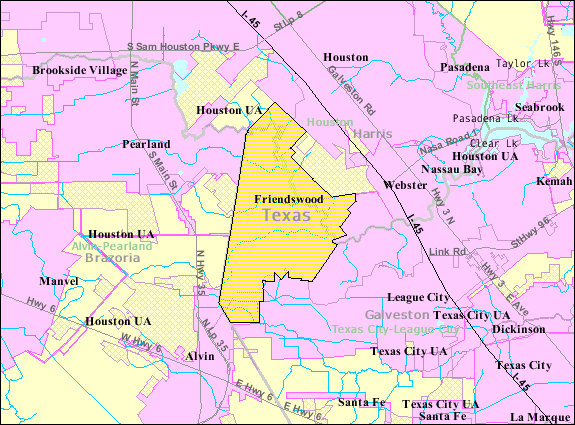
Map of Friendswood

Friendswood is located at 29°30′45″N 95°11′53″W (29.512532, –95.197933).

According to the United States Census Bureau, the city covers a total area of 54.1 square kilometres (20.9 sq mi), of which 53.7 square kilometres (20.7 sq mi) are land area and 0.15 square miles (0.4 km^{2}), or 0.69%, is covered by water.

== Demographics ==
Historical population
Census	Pop.	Note	%±
1970	5,675		—
1980	10,719		88.9%
1990	22,814		112.8%
2000	29,037		27.3%
2010	35,805		23.3%
2020	41,213		15.1%
U.S. Decennial Census; 1850–1900 1910; 1920 1930; 1950 1960 1970; 1980 1990 2000; 2010

As of the 2020 census, there were 41,213 people, 14,503 households, and 10,427 families residing in the city.

=== Racial and ethnic composition ===
Friendswood city, Texas – Racial and ethnic composition Note: the US Census treats Hispanic/Latino as an ethnic category. This table excludes Latinos from the racial categories and assigns them to a separate category. Hispanics/Latinos may be of any race.
Race / Ethnicity (NH = Non-Hispanic)	Pop 2000	Pop 2010	Pop 2020	% 2000	% 2010	% 2020
White alone (NH)	24,548	27,733	28,587	84.54%	77.46%	69.36%
Black or African American alone (NH)	774	1,184	1,441	2.67%	3.31%	3.50%
Native American or Alaska Native alone (NH)	95	95	93	0.33%	0.27%	0.23%
Asian alone (NH)	690	1,720	2,574	2.38%	4.80%	6.25%
Native Hawaiian or Pacific Islander alone (NH)	4	17	31	0.01%	0.05%	0.08%
Other race alone (NH)	37	62	136	0.13%	0.17%	0.33%
Mixed race or Multiracial (NH)	336	524	1,595	1.16%	1.46%	3.87%
Hispanic or Latino (any race)	2,553	4,470	6,756	8.79%	12.48%	16.39%
Total	29,037	35,805	41,213	100.00%	100.00%	100.00%

=== 2020 census ===
The median age was 40.7 years. 25.7% of residents were under the age of 18 and 16.6% of residents were 65 years of age or older. For every 100 females there were 92.6 males, and for every 100 females age 18 and over there were 90.3 males age 18 and over.

99.9% of residents lived in urban areas, while 0.1% lived in rural areas.

There were 14,503 households in Friendswood, of which 39.3% had children under the age of 18 living in them. Of all households, 63.6% were married-couple households, 11.3% were households with a male householder and no spouse or partner present, and 21.5% were households with a female householder and no spouse or partner present. About 18.9% of all households were made up of individuals and 10.5% had someone living alone who was 65 years of age or older.

There were 15,148 housing units, of which 4.3% were vacant. The homeowner vacancy rate was 1.3% and the rental vacancy rate was 7.6%.

Racial composition as of the 2020 census
Race	Number	Percent
White	30,470	73.9%
Black or African American	1,492	3.6%
American Indian and Alaska Native	164	0.4%
Asian	2,618	6.4%
Native Hawaiian and Other Pacific Islander	35	0.1%
Some other race	1,492	3.6%
Two or more races	4,942	12.0%
Hispanic or Latino (of any race)	6,756	16.4%

=== 2010 census ===
In 2010, the median income for a household was $115,439 and for a family was $128,898. Males had a median income of $67,084 versus $35,447 for females. The per capita income for the city was $39,515. About 2.3% of families and 3.3% of the population were below the poverty line, including 3.4% of those under age 18 and 3.8% of those age 65 or over.

=== 2000 census ===
As of the 2000 census, 29,037 people, 10,107 households, and 8,085 families resided in the city. The population density was 1,381.2 inhabitants per square mile (533.3/km^{2}). The 10,405 housing units had an average density of 495.0 per square mile (191.1/km^{2}). The racial makeup of the city was 90.09% White, 2.70% African American, 0.40% Native American, 2.39% Asian, 2.80% from other races, and 1.63% from two or more races. Hispanics or Latinos of any race were 8.79% of the population.

Of the 10,107 households, 43.7% had children under the age of 18 living with them, 68.5% were married couples living together, 8.7% had a female householder with no husband present, and 20.0% were not families. About 17.0% of all households were made up of individuals, and 6.3% had someone living alone who was 65 years of age or older. The average household size was 2.85 and the average family size was 3.23.

In the city, the population was distributed as 30.0% under the age of 18, 6.2% from 18 to 24, 29.4% from 25 to 44, 25.7% from 45 to 64, and 8.6% who were 65 years of age or older. The median age was 37 years. For every 100 females, there were 93.7 males. For every 100 females age 18 and over, there were 90.4 males.

== Government and infrastructure ==
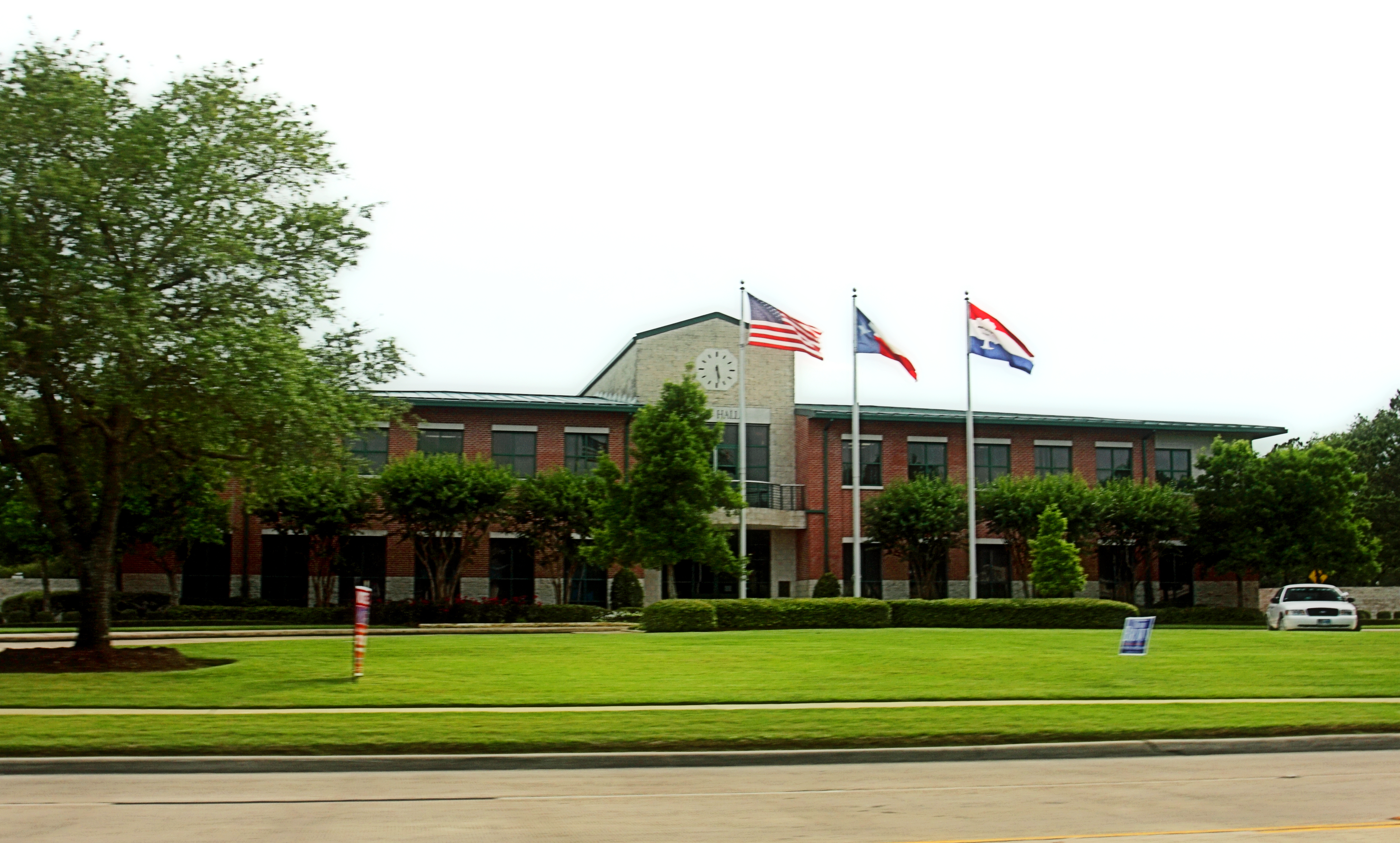
Friendswood City Hall

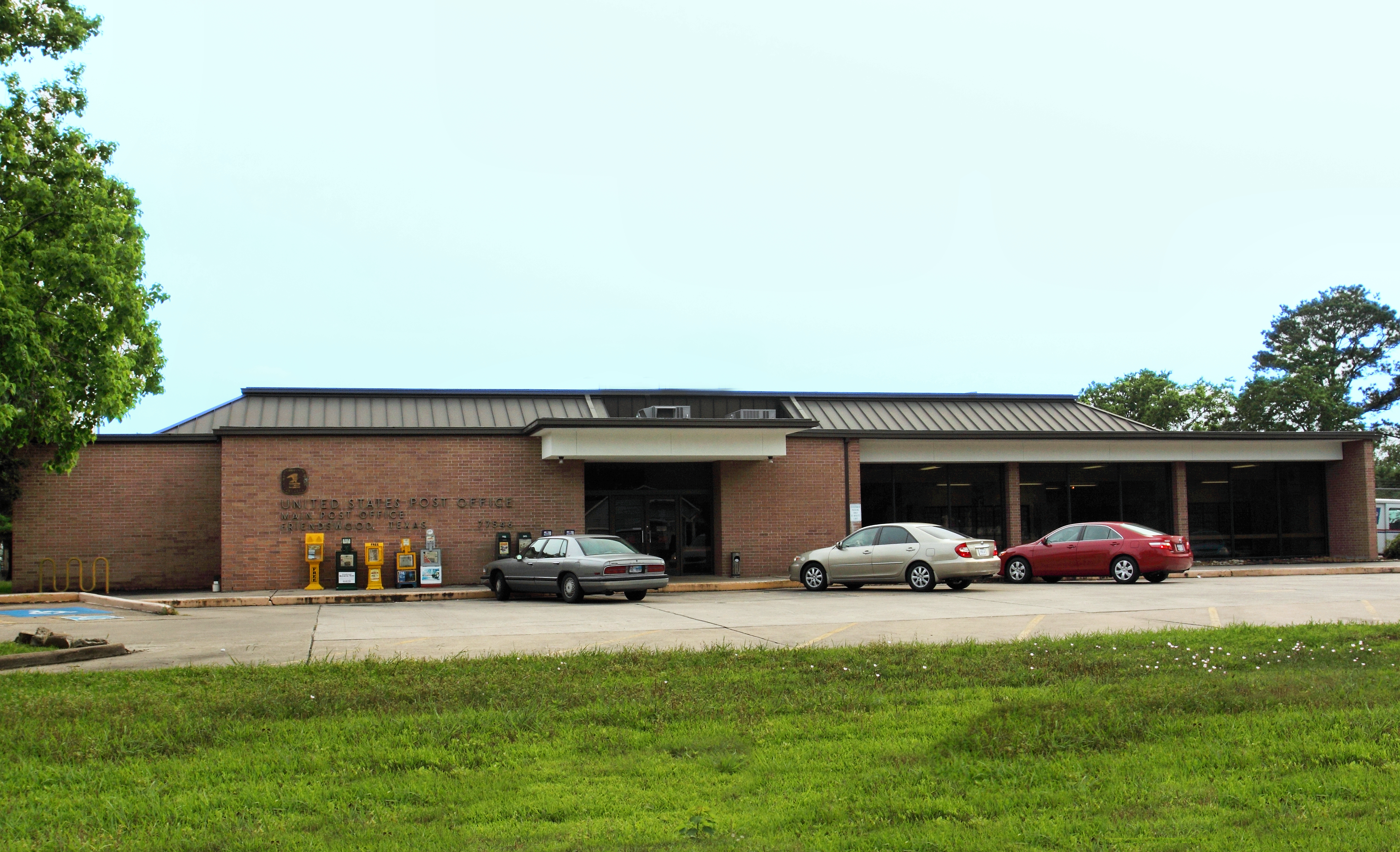
Friendswood Post Office

Friendswood City Hall is located at 910 South Friendswood Drive. The Friendswood Post Office is located at 310 Morningside Drive. Some locations in the City of Houston have Friendswood mailing addresses. NASA astronaut Michael Foreman was elected mayor in 2018.

== Economy ==
The Baybrook Mall is physically located in the City of Houston, but has a Friendswood mailing address.

== Education ==
=== Primary and secondary schools ===
==== Public schools ====
Students in Friendswood attend schools in either Friendswood Independent School District (FISD) if they live south of Clear Creek (Galveston County), or Clear Creek Independent School District (CCISD) if they live north of Clear Creek (Harris County). The CCISD portion is within the Board of Trustees District 4, represented by Stuart J. Stromeyer as of 2008.

Cline Elementary School, Westwood Elementary School, Bales Intermediate School, and Windsong Intermediate School serve the FISD portion of Friendswood. All FISD residents are zoned to Friendswood Junior High School and Friendswood High School.

CCISD students from Friendswood attend Wedgewood Elementary School in Friendswood, and Brookside Intermediate School in Friendswood. Most residents of CCISD Friendswood are zoned to Clear Brook High School in unincorporated Harris County, while some residents of CCISD Friendswood are zoned to Clear Springs High School in League City.

Students who live in the area around Friendswood, but are in unincorporated Harris County with address listed as Friendswood or Webster attend Greene Elementary School or Landolt Elementary School in unincorporated Harris County for elementary schools. For middle school they are zoned to Westbrook Intermediate School in Houston.

=== Public libraries ===
The Friendswood Public Library at 416 South Friendswood Drive serves Friendswood.

=== Colleges and universities ===
The Friendswood ISD area is assigned to College of the Mainland, while the portion of Clear Creek ISD in Harris County (and therefore the Harris County part of Friendswood) is assigned to San Jacinto College.

== Controversy ==
In 2011, the City of Friendswood locked access to its computer system, e-mail and online services after hackers extracted hundreds of emails from then Police Chief Robert Wieners and posted them online. Wieners allegedly wrote an e-mail in which he described a suspect as a “stupid bitch” who “got what she deserved.” Wieners then goes on to state “I’ll bet she was fat and black too.” Wieners denied he was the creator of the e-mail. The hackers also claimed Wieners' e-mail account contained an anti-Muslim chain e-mail entitled “1,400 years of inbreeding amongst Muslims.”

== Notable people ==
- Greg Bonnen, neurosurgeon and Republican member of the Texas House of Representatives from Friendswood
- Stephen Bowen, NASA astronaut and a United States Navy submariner.
- Katie Rose Clarke, Broadway actor, famous for the roles of Clara in Light in the Piazza, Glinda in Wicked, and Hannah in Allegiance
- Haley Carter, former Houston Dash soccer player
- Robin Coleman, American Gladiator Hellga, 2001 World's Strongest Woman (bronze)
- Charles L. Cotton, president of the National Rifle Association of America (NRA)
- Penny Edwards, actress known for many western films; died in Friendswood
- R'Bonney Gabriel, beauty queen, model, fashion designer, Miss Universe 2022
- Joseph Gutheinz, attorney and investigator of stolen and missing Moon rocks
- Suzanna Hupp, former member of the Texas House of Representatives
- Corey Julks, MLB player
- Christopher C. Kraft Jr., aerospace engineer and NASA administrator
- Glynn Lunney, NASA flight director
- Bill McArthur, retired United States Army colonel and NASA astronaut
- Balor Moore, former MLB pitcher resides in Friendswood
- Ronnie Price, NBA basketball player
- Bruce Prichard, executive director for WWE and co-host of Something to Wrestle with Bruce Prichard
- Ryan Sitton, Republican nominee for the Texas Railroad Commission in the November 4, 2014, general election
- Deke Slayton, Mercury Seven astronaut and NASA administrator
- René Steinke, novelist and author of the 2014 novel Friendswood
- Steve Stockman, politician
- Booker T, and spouse Sharmell Sullivan-Huffman – professional wrestling personalities
- Larry Taylor, Republican member of the Texas Senate from District 11 (2013–Present) and Texas House of Representatives from District 24 (2003–2013)
- Randy Weber, Republican member of the U.S. House of Representatives from Texas's 14th congressional district (2013–Present) and former member of the Texas House of Representatives (2009–2013)

== Climate and weather ==
The climate in this area is characterized by hot, humid summers and generally mild to cool winters. According to the Köppen climate classification, Friendswood has a humid subtropical climate, Cfa on climate maps.

Friendswood has a historical reputation among Friends, Friendswood inhabitants, for extreme weather due to the close proximity to Galveston Island and therefore the Gulf of Mexico. In recent history Friendswood was devastated by Hurricane Harvey in 2017, a category 4 hurricane, along with Hurricane Beryl of 2024. After numerous major storms swept through southeastern Texas, where Friendswood is located, residents began building houses above ground to avoid flooding. Major flooding is caused by the rise of Clear Creek, a body of water near the suburbs of Polly Ranch.

== Legacy ==
The 2014 novel Friendswood, set in the area, was written by René Steinke.
