= Hanifa Yousoufi =

Afghan mountain climber

Personal information
- Nationality: Afghan
- Born: c. 1995
- Occupation: Mountaineer

Climbing career
- Major ascents: Noshaq

Hanifa Yousoufi became the first Afghan woman to summit her country's highest peak Mount Noshaq, at a height of 24,580 ft (7,492 meters). She achieved this feat on August 10, 2018, as part of a month-long expedition organised and funded by Ascend: Leadership Through Athletics, a nonprofit organisation that trains young women to climb mountains. Noshaq is the second highest mountain in the Hindu Kush range, which runs along the Afghanistan-Pakistan border.

== Personal life ==
Yousoufi grew up in Kabul and was sent to Pakistan to marry an older man at the age of about 14. (Note: Yousoufi's birthday was never celebrated, and date of birth is unknown) She described the experience as being like "a slave for cooking and cleaning". After approximately two years she divorced him and went back to her parents in Kabul.

Her cousin encouraged Yousoufi to join the program in 2016, and since then she worked as a program assistant while training for climbs. After climbing Noshaq, Yousoufi chose to limit the media exposure to radio and Facebook only (no TV coverage) because of security concerns, but publicized her full name out of pride for her achievement and to inspire other Afghan women.

== The expedition ==
It was a $30,000 expedition, which was fully funded by Ascend Athletics through private individual donors. The team had to face a number of complications, including nearby fighting between Taliban forces and the Afghan army. Yousoufi had been training with Ascend Athletics to attempt to climb Mt Noshaq since 2016. Mount Noshaq was closed to climbers for about 30 years, due to the fact of several years of unrest during the Taliban rule in the country. It was again opened up in the year 2009. The Taliban shot down two Afghan National Army helicopters in the Zebak on the day before the group was supposed to fly from Kabul to the nearest airfield to hike to the base camp. So, the group was flown to a safer village to continue with the expedition. Mount Noshaq, world's one of the most challenging summits, involves hazards and challenges like dangerous crevasses, fractured ice faces, loose rocks, sub-zero temperature and socio-political issues involving the Taliban; the expedition to the peak involves trekking through the war-torn regions, riddled with land-mines dating back to the Civil War era and where outsiders face the danger of being kidnapped or assaulted. The climb started at 9 a.m. and while climbing, Yousoufi faced altitude sickness in Camp Two and had to be brought down to Camp One. Next morning she went back to Camp Two after resting in Camp One. The other two girls could not continue the trek with Yousoufi, due to altitude sickness and she had to continue the climb alone. She reached the summit at 7:10 p.m.

== See also ==
- Bachendri Pal
- Junko Tabei
- Wanda Rutkiewicz
- Arlene Blum
