= Villa Marina Hotel =

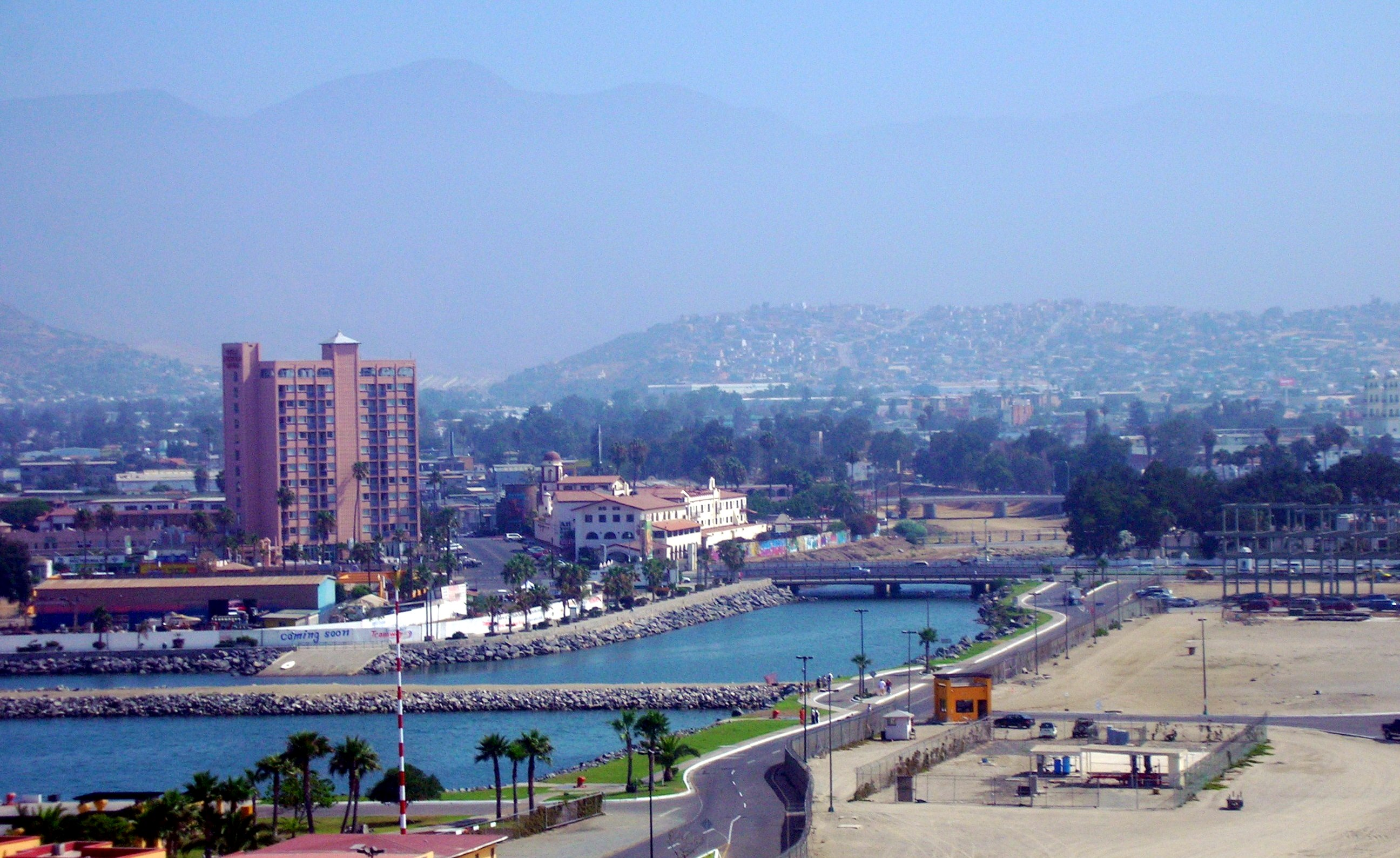
- Interactive map of the Villa Marina Hotel area

General information
- Type: Hotel
- Location: Ensenada
- Coordinates: 31°51′35.5″N 116°37′17″W
- Completed: 1987

Technical details
- Floor count: 14

The Villa Marina Hotel is a high-rise building in Ensenada, Baja California. It serves primarily as hotel for tourists to the city and is located adjacent to the Port of Ensenada.

It is located within the central business district of Ensenada and is the tallest building within the downtown area, though not in the city.

== See also ==
- List of hotels in Mexico
- List of companies of Mexico
