= Bunny Meyer =

American YouTuber

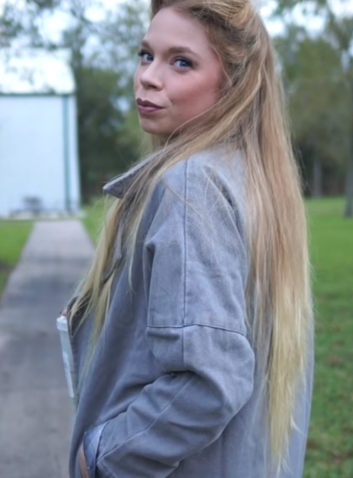
- Meyer in 2016
- Born: Rachel Marie Meyer; August 3, 1985 (age 40); Houston, Texas, U.S.
- Other names: Bunny; grav3yardgirl
- Occupation: YouTuber

YouTube information
- Channel: Grav3yardgirl
- Years active: 2010–present
- Subscribers: 8.6 million
- Views: 1.88 billion
- Last updated: March 8, 2026
- Website: swampfam.com

Rachel "Bunny" Marie Meyer (born August 3, 1985) is an American beauty YouTuber known by the username grav3yardgirl.

== Early life ==
Rachel Marie Meyer was born in Houston on August 3, 1985, and graduated from Friendswood High School in 2003. She participated mainly in theatre, but was also a member of FFA, debate, student council, and the French National Honors Society. She met her current boyfriend, whom she calls "Dogman" in videos, during her sophomore year. Meyer originally pursued a career in the fashion industry, attending Texas Woman's University, San Jacinto College, and finally the University of Houston, from which she graduated in 2007. However, she broke her hand in a car accident in 2010, which left her unable to pursue a career in the fashion industry. She created her YouTube channel later that year in an effort to redirect her trauma in a positive way.

== YouTube channel ==
Based in Pearland, Texas, Meyer's YouTube channel was originally focused on paranormal experiences and trips to graveyards. She later transitioned her channel to focus on fashion and makeup, as well as a series called "Does This Thing Really Work?" in which she reviews As Seen On TV products. Meyer refers to her followers as her "Swamp Family".

As of January 2025, her channel has over 8.5 million subscribers and 1.8 billion video views.

== Collaborations ==
In May 2018, Meyer was struggling to maintain her audience. Shane Dawson contacted her and offered to help rebrand her channel as part of his ongoing documentary-style web series.

== Makeup collection ==
On June 6, 2016, Meyer released her "Swamp Queen" makeup collection globally in collaboration with Tarte Cosmetics. The collection was sold at several leading cosmetics stores, such as Macy's, Ulta and Sephora, and included an eye shadow palette and two lipsticks.

== Awards and nominations ==
In 2014 and 2016, Meyer received nominations for Teen Choice Awards Choice Web Star in Fashion/Beauty, though she did not win in either year.
