= Shabnam Mobarez =

Afghan footballer

Personal information
- Full name: Shabnam Mobarez
- Date of birth: 27 August 1995 (age 31)
- Place of birth: Kabul, Afghanistan
- Position: Midfielder

Team information
- Current team: Aalborg BK

Senior career*
Years	Team	Apps	(Gls)
- Aalborg BK

International career
2014–	Afghanistan		
- * Club domestic league appearances and goals

Shabnam Mobarez (Pashto: شبنم مبارز; born 27 August 1995) is an Afghan football player. As of 2016, she was captain of the Afghanistan women's national football team.

== Early life ==
Born in Kabul, Afghanistan, to an ethnic Pashtun family, originally from Kapisa, Mobarez emigrated to Denmark with her family in 2002–2003 due to the War in Afghanistan (2001–present). She began playing football with boys in the street without her parents knowing and was later invited to join a professional club, which she did with her parents' support. She played for the Danish City Club.

== Playing career ==
=== Club ===
==== Aalborg ====
Mobarez plays for Danish club, Aalborg BK.

=== International ===
Mobarez declined an offer to play for the Denmark women's national football team and instead chose to represent Afghanistan. Of the choice, she said, "We are trying to bring something positive to the country. These women are so brave they inspire me to do better and, because I live in a safe country, to work harder for them." She started playing for Afghanistan in 2014 and captained the team from 2016. After starting with the national team as a striker, Mobarez switched to the midfielder position.

In March 2018, Mobarez was part of a group of players from 20 different countries who played in a match in the Dead Sea region of Jordan and set a new world record for the lowest altitude match ever played.

After the 2021 Taliban offensive, Mobarez was one of a number of Afghan women's footballers who were evacuated from Afghanistan to Australia. She has spoken of the "traumatising experience getting out" of a Taliban-controlled Afghanistan.

== Other work ==
Mobarez coaches women's teams at a refugee camp in Denmark.
