= Centro =

Centro may refer to:

== Places ==
=== Brazil ===
- Centro, Santa Maria, a neighborhood in Santa Maria, Rio Grande do Sul, Brazil
- Centro, Porto Alegre, a neighborhood of Porto Alegre, Rio Grande do Sul, Brazil
- Centro (Duque de Caxias), a neighborhood of Duque de Caxias, Rio de Janeiro, Brazil
- Centro (Niterói), a neighborhood of Niterói, Rio de Janeiro, Brazil
- Centro, Rio de Janeiro, a neighborhood of Rio de Janeiro, Brazil
- Centro (São Paulo), the historic downtown of São Paulo, Brazil
- Centro (Aracaju), Aracaju, Sergipe, Brazil
- Centro (Campinas), a neighborhood of Campinas, São Paulo, Brazil

=== Mexico ===
- Centro, Guadalajara, Jalisco, Mexico
- Centro, Puerto Vallarta, Jalisco, Mexico
- Centro Municipality, Tabasco, Mexico
- Centro (borough), Tijuana, Baja California, Mexico
- Centro, Yucatán, Mexico
- Centro, the historic center of Mexico City, Mexico

=== Elsewhere ===
- Centro Habana, Cuba
- Centro, Mandaue, a barangay in the Philippines
- Centro Region, Portugal
- Centro, Moca, Puerto Rico, a subdivision (also called a barrio) of Moca, Puerto Rico
- Centro (Madrid), a district of the city of Madrid, Spain
- Centro (Málaga), a district of the city of Málaga, Andalusia, Spain
- Centro, Montevideo, downtown barrio of Montevideo, Uruguay

== Transport ==
- Centro, the Central New York Regional Transportation Authority in the United States
- Centro, a Teleférico de Uruapan station
- Plaxton Centro, a bus body built by Plaxton in the UK
- West Midlands Passenger Transport Executive, formerly named Centro, the body formerly responsible for public transport in the county of West Midlands, England

== Other ==
- CentrO, a shopping mall in Oberhausen, Germany
- Centro Tampa, a Spanish-language newspaper in Tampa, Florida, USA
- Palm Centro
- Vicinity Centres, a retail property developer formerly trading as Centro Property Group
- Centro de Estudios Puertorriqueños, a research institute at Hunter College
- Reliance Centro, a chain of fashion stores in India

== See also ==
- El Centro (disambiguation)
- Centro Direzionale (disambiguation)
- Central District (disambiguation)
