= Center =

Center or centre may refer to:

== Mathematics ==
- Center (geometry), the middle of an object
- Center (algebra), used in various contexts
  - Center (group theory)
  - Center (ring theory)
- Graph center, the set of all vertices of minimum eccentricity
- Central tendency, measures of the central tendency (center) in a set of data
- Centrality, degree of connection within a graph/ network

== Places ==
=== United States ===
- Centre, Alabama
- Center, Colorado
- Center, Georgia
- Centre, Iowa
- Center, Indiana
- Center, Warrick County, Indiana
- Center, Kentucky
- Center, Missouri
- Center, Nebraska
- Center, North Dakota
- Centre County, Pennsylvania
- Center, Portland, Oregon
- Center, Texas
- Center, Outagamie County, Wisconsin
- Center, Rock County, Wisconsin
  - Center (community), Wisconsin
- Center Township (disambiguation)
- Centre Township (disambiguation)
- Centre Avenue (disambiguation)
- Center Hill (disambiguation)

=== Other countries ===
- Centre region, Hainaut, Belgium
- Centre Region, Burkina Faso
- Centre Region (Cameroon)
- Centre-Val de Loire, formerly Centre, France
- Centre (department), Haiti
- Centre Department (Ivory Coast)
- Centre (Chamber of Deputies of Luxembourg constituency)
- Centrum, Warsaw (also known as Centre), Poland
  - Strict Warsaw Centre
- Centru (development region) (Centre), Romania
- Center, Celje, Slovenia
- Center District, Ljubljana, Slovenia
- Center District, Maribor, Slovenia
- Centre, Badalona, Catalonia, Spain

== Sports ==
- Center (gridiron football), a position in American and Canadian football
- Centre (Australian rules football), a position on the Centre line
- Center (basketball), a position
- Centre (ice hockey), a position
- Centre (rugby league), a position
- Centre (rugby union), a position
- Center fielder, often called "center", a position in baseball
- Centre (netball), a position

== Other uses ==
- The Centre, a shorthand term for the central Government of India
- Centrism, the political middle ground between the left wing and the right wing
- The Center (political party), a political party in Switzerland
- Centre (Polish parliamentary group), a parliamentary group in Poland
- Center (band), a Russian-speaking band
- Center (HTML element), coded with <center></center>
- Centre Academy East Anglia, an independent special school in Brettenham, Suffolk, England
- Centre College, a liberal arts college in Danville, Kentucky, United States
- Centre Radio, a former British radio station
- Centers (Fourth Way), in G.I. Gurdjieff's Fourth Way teaching
- Area control center, or center, in air traffic control

== See also ==
- Central (disambiguation)
- Center High School (disambiguation)
- Centre Party (disambiguation)
- The Centre (disambiguation)
- City centre
- Downtown
- Central business district
