= Alfredo V. Bonfil, Quintana Roo =

Alfredo V. Bonfil
- Community
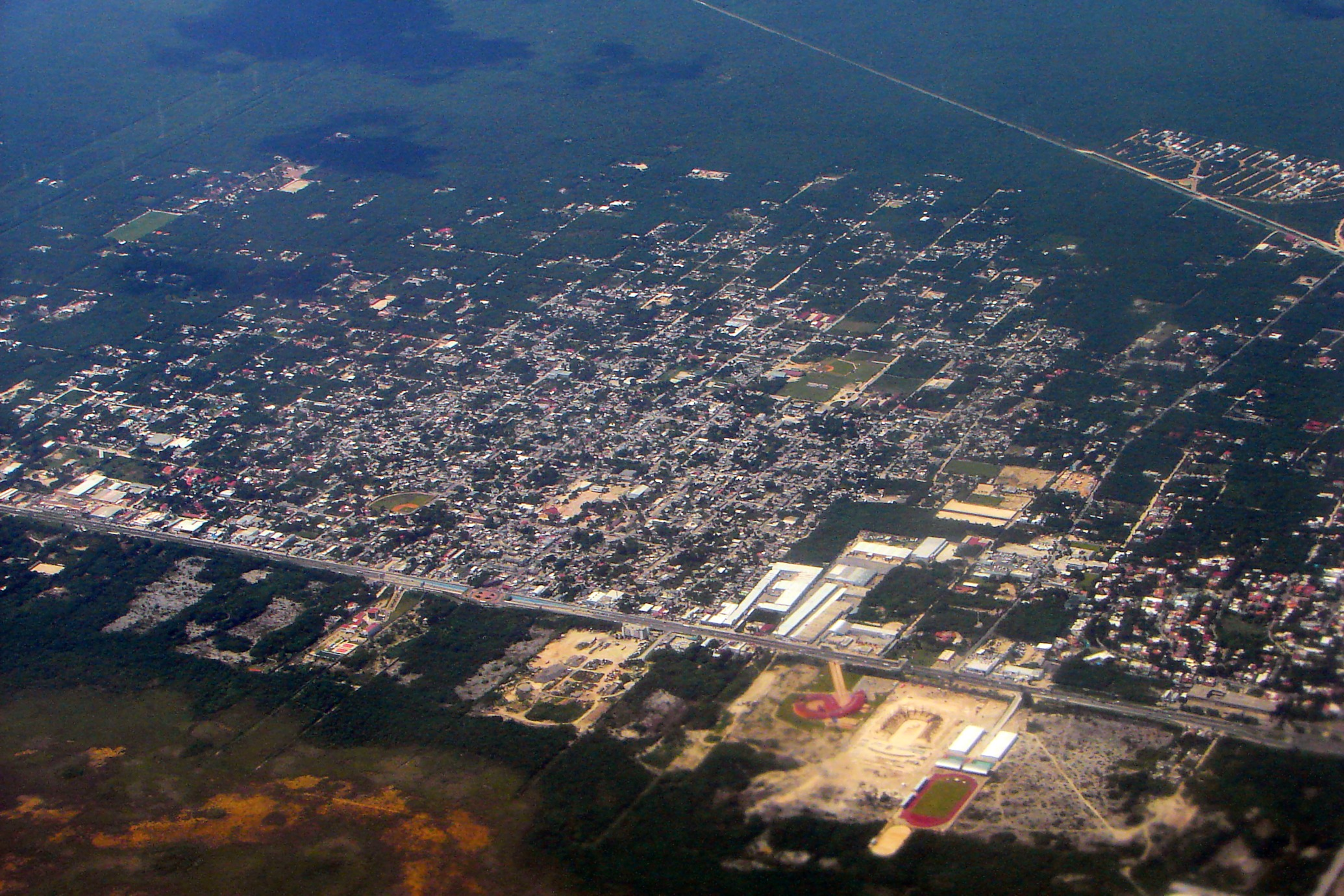
- Aerial view of Alfredo V. Bonfil
- Interactive map of Alfredo V. Bonfil
- Coordinates: 21°04′57″N 86°51′05″W
- Country: Mexico
- State: Quintana Roo
- Municipality: Benito Juárez

Alfredo V. Bonfil is one of the communities in Benito Juárez Municipality, Quintana Roo, Mexico. It is effectively a commuter suburb of Cancún and is located just south of that city. Its population at the 2010 census was 14,900 inhabitants.

== See also ==
- Puerto Cancún
- Puerto Juárez
