= Nichupté Vehicular Bridge =

Bridge connecting Downtown Cancún to the Hotel Zone

Nichupté Vehicular Bridge Puente Vehicular Nichupté
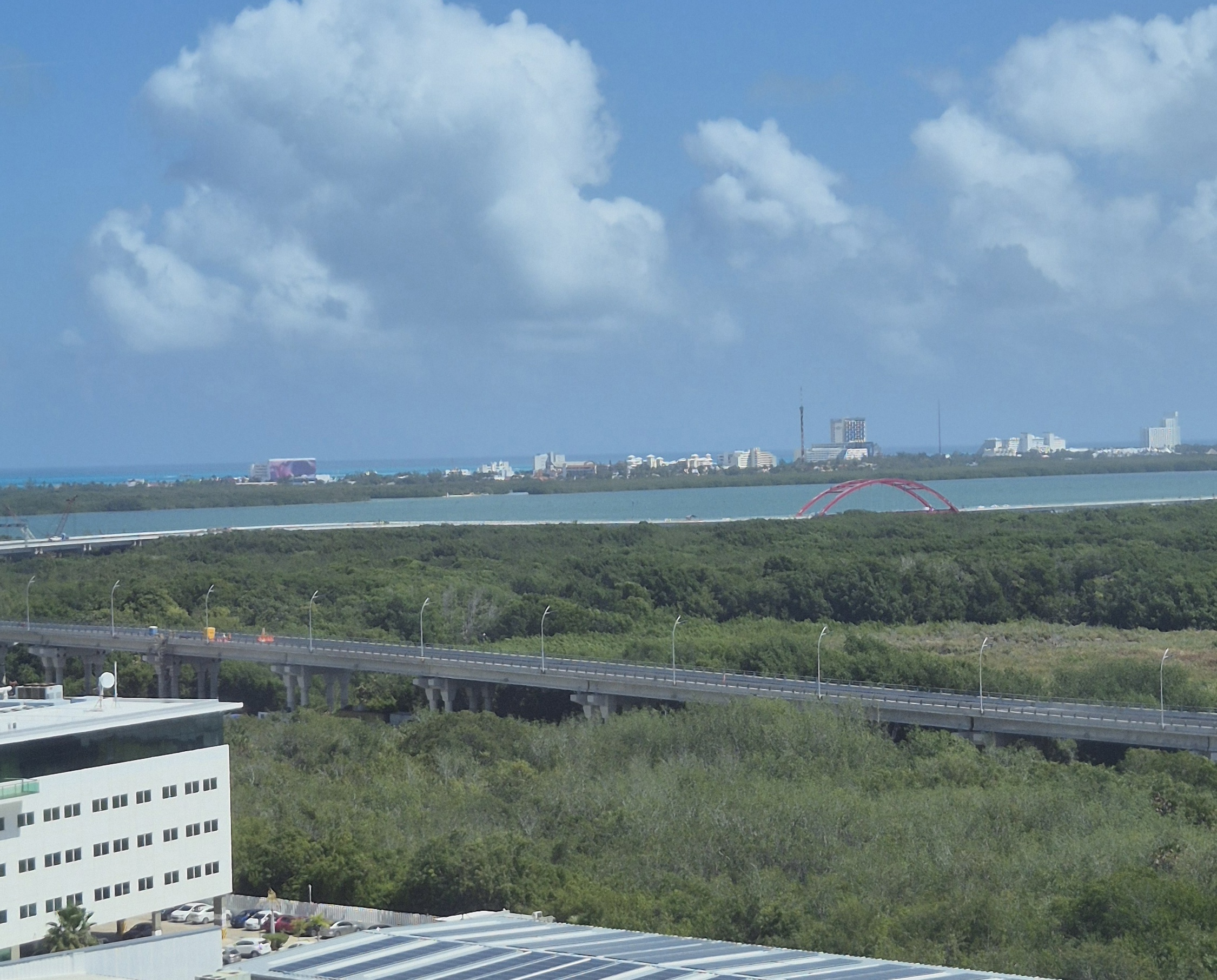
- View of the Nichupté Vehicular Bridge in Cancún
- Coordinates: 21°08′02″N 86°48′12.5″W
- Carries: Motor vehicles
- Crosses: Downtown Cancún, Nichupté Lagoon, Hotel Zone
- Locale: Benito Juárez Municipality, Quintana Roo
- Official name: Nichupté Vehicular Bridge
- Owner: Government of Cancún
- Maintained by: Secretariat of Infrastructure, Communications and Transportation

Characteristics
- Design: Precast segmented box girder bridge
- Total length: 11.2 km (7.0 mi)
- Width: 14.9 m (49 ft)
- No. of lanes: 3

History
- Constructed by: ICA Constructora
- Construction start: August 2022
- Construction end: May 2026
- Construction cost: MXN$12.021 billion
- Opened: 2 May 2026
- Inaugurated: 2 May 2026

Statistics
- Daily traffic: 12,000 vehicles

Location
- Interactive map of Nichupté Vehicular Bridge

The Nichupté Vehicular Bridge (Spanish: Puente Vehicular Nichupté) is a concrete bridge that connects Cancún's Downtown to the Hotel Zone. It is the longest bridge in Mexico and the second longest bridge in Latin America over water. It opened on 2 May 2026 in an inauguration ceremony attended by President Claudia Sheinbaum.

== History ==
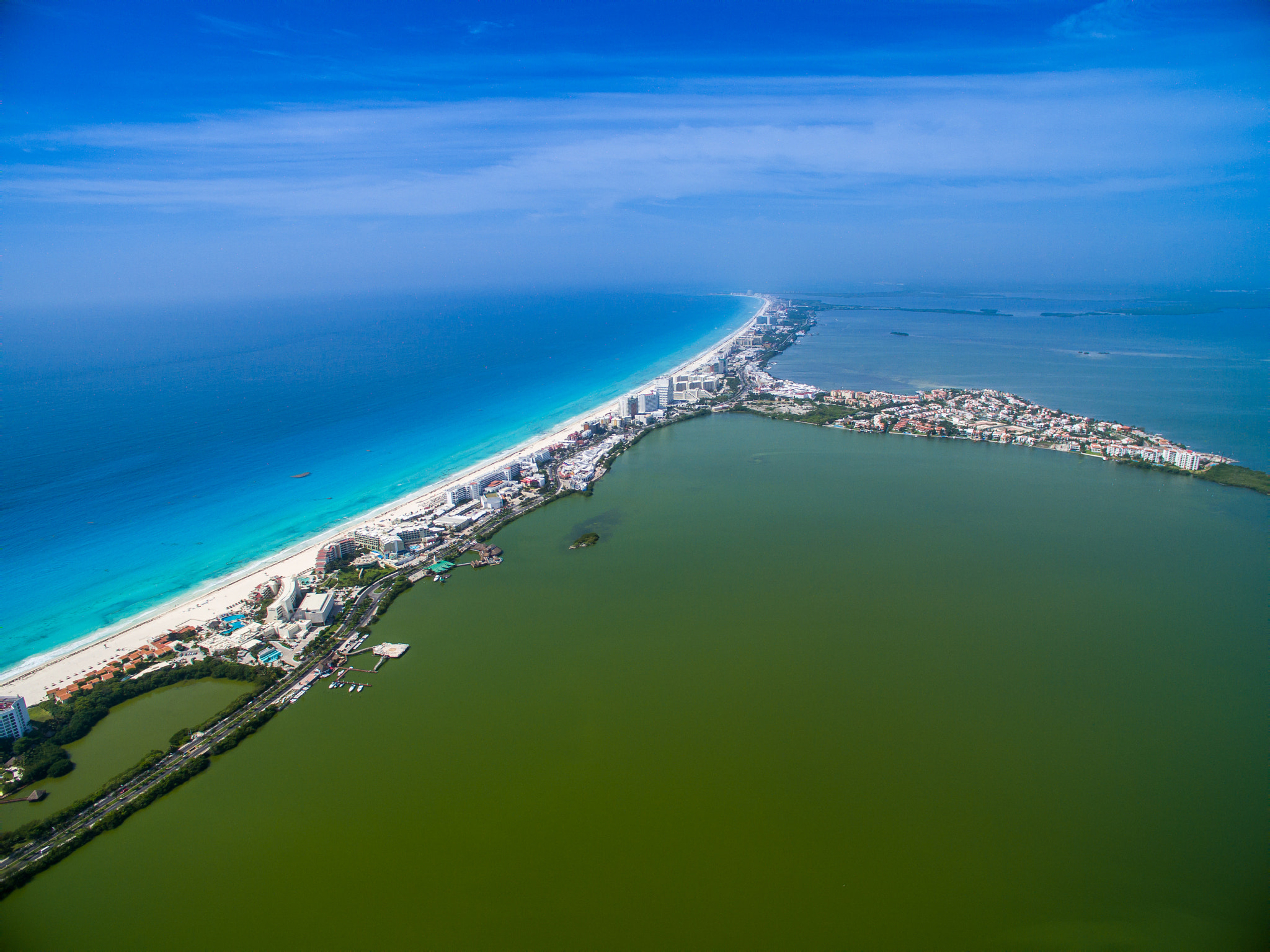
Nichupté Lagoon

First proposed in September 2008, the bridge was part of Cancún's 2030 vision for strategically planning the area. President Claudia Sheinbaum shared that she planned to visit its inauguration and allocated more money to speed up progress. Construction started in August 2022 and was completed in May 2026 after numerous delays and cost increases due to technical challenges, environmental concerns, and construction setbacks, pushing completion beyond initial targets. It was built over Nichupté Lagoon and allows vehicles to get across the lagoon 45 minutes faster than usual compared to the 2 hours and 10 minutes it originally took. MXN$6.486 billion were set aside to construct the bridge. The final cost ended up being MXN$12.021 billion.

By early 2026, the bridge had reached over 94% completion, with final works including paving and load testing. Authorities announced that the bridge would open to traffic on 2 May 2026 following final inspections and technical tests. Nichupté Vehicular Bridge was inaugurated on 2 May 2026 by Municipal President Ana Patricia Peralta de la Peña, Governor of Quintana Roo Mara Lezama Espinosa, Secretary of Infrastructure, Communications and Transportation Jesús Antonio Esteva Medina, and Mexican President Claudia Sheinbaum.

== Layout ==
The bridge has a main span over Nichupté Lagoon of 8.8 km and a total length of 11.2 km. It extends from Luis Donaldo Colosio Boulevard in Downtown Cancún to the middle of the Hotel Zone at Kukulcán Boulevard. The interchanges measure 2.4 km. It includes a 103 meter tall metal arch. The bridge takes 10 minutes to cross and is the second longest in Latin America over a body of water.

== See also ==
- List of longest bridges
- List of bridges in Mexico
