= The Centre =

The Centre or The Center may refer to:

== Places ==
- The Centre (Evansville), Indiana, U.S., now Old National Events Plaza
- The Centre (Saskatoon), Saskatchewan, Canada, a shopping mall
- The Centre (Livingston), West Lothian, Scotland, a shopping centre
- The Centre Cumbernauld, North Lanarkshire, Scotland, a shopping centre
- The Centre, Bristol, England, a public open space
- The Center, Hong Kong, a skyscraper
- The Center, New Mexico, U.S., a proposed technology facility
- The Centre, former name for Qmunity, an LGBT community centre in Vancouver, British Columbia, Canada

== Arts and entertainment ==
- The Center (TV series), an American afternoon music program
- The Centre, a fictional entity in the limited edition comic series DC: The New Frontier and animated film adaptation Justice League: The New Frontier
- The Centre, a fictional organization in the TV series The Pretender
- The Center, a fictional organization in the TV series Martin Mystery
- "The Centre", sixth episode of the 1965 Doctor Who serial The Web Planet
- "The Centre", an episode of Gimme a Break!
- El Centro (TV series), a Spanish television series

== Other uses ==
- informal name for the Government of India
- The Centre (political party), in Switzerland

== See also ==
- Center (disambiguation)
- Centro (disambiguation)
- El Centro, California, a place in U.S.
- El Centro, Cancún, a place in Mexico.
- LaCenter, Kentucky, a place in U.S.
- La Center, Washington, a place in U.S.
- La Center (sternwheeler), a steamboat
- Absolute (philosophy)
- Central business district
- City centre
- Downtown
- Government of the Soviet Union
