= Cantred (disambiguation) =

A cantred was a subdivision of a county in Ireland in the 13th to 16th centuries.

Cantred may also refer to:

- Barony (Ireland) or cantred

== See also ==
- Canter
- Cantref, an obsolete subdivision of a county in Wales
- Center (disambiguation)
