= Los Tres Reyes, Quintana Roo =

Coordinates: 21°01′26″N 87°06′39″W

Los Tres Reyes is one of the communities in the municipality of Benito Juárez Municipality, Quintana Roo. It is effectively a commuter suburb located southwest of Cancún. It had a 2010 census population of 470 inhabitants and is situated at 8 meters (26 ft.) above sea level.
