= Downtown Cancún =

District of Cancún, Mexico

Downtown Cancún El Centro
- City district
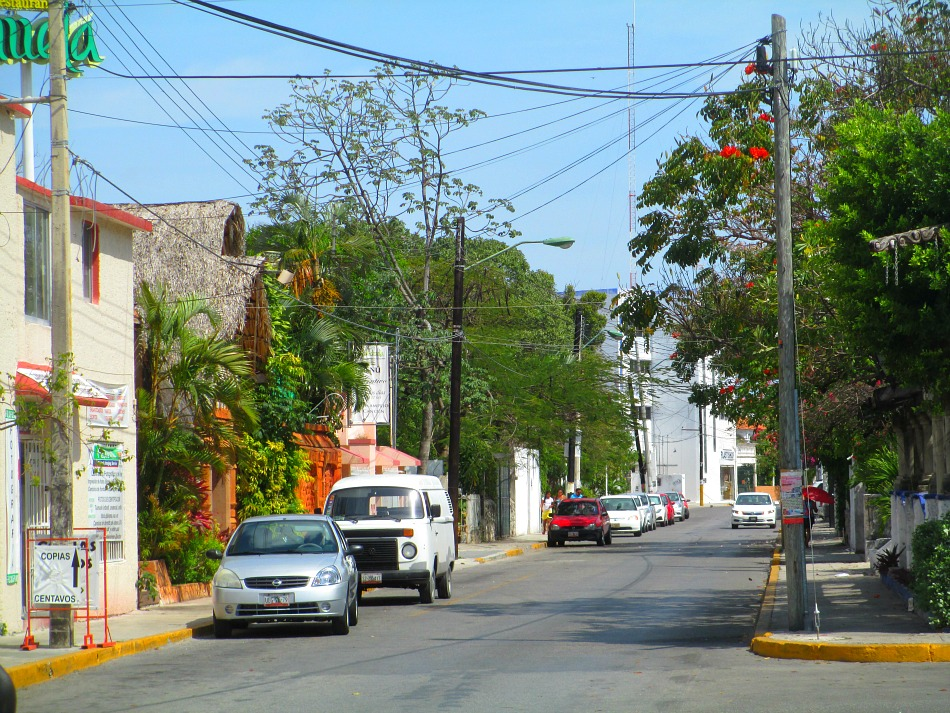
- Calle Margaritas in Supermanzana 22
- Interactive map of Downtown Cancún
- Coordinates: 21°09′04″N 86°50′30″W
- Country: Mexico
- State: Quintana Roo
- Municipality: Benito Juárez
- City: Cancún
- Founded: April 20, 1970

Downtown Cancún (Spanish: El Centro de Cancún) is an official district of Cancún, Mexico. It is the non-tourist-centered, local area of the city and is where most natives live as opposed to the Hotel Zone to the east on the coast which was built to accommodate tourists. They are split by Nichupté Lagoon and connected by the Nichupté Vehicular Bridge. In contrast to the more famous part of the city, downtown mainly consists of markets, parks, and office buildings. It has more traditional Mexican cultural influences than the surrounding communities. The district has a local artisanal market called Mercado 28.

The district has recently seen an increase in poverty and crime. It is mostly residential area due to there being no permanent residents in the Hotel Zone. The Benito Juárez Municipal Hall is located here.

== History ==
The district was founded in 1970, along with the city as a whole, and was a result of careful planning. The entirety of it is divided into city blocks. Most of Cancún's population lives here and it contains all educational institutions and public service buildings.

== Gallery ==
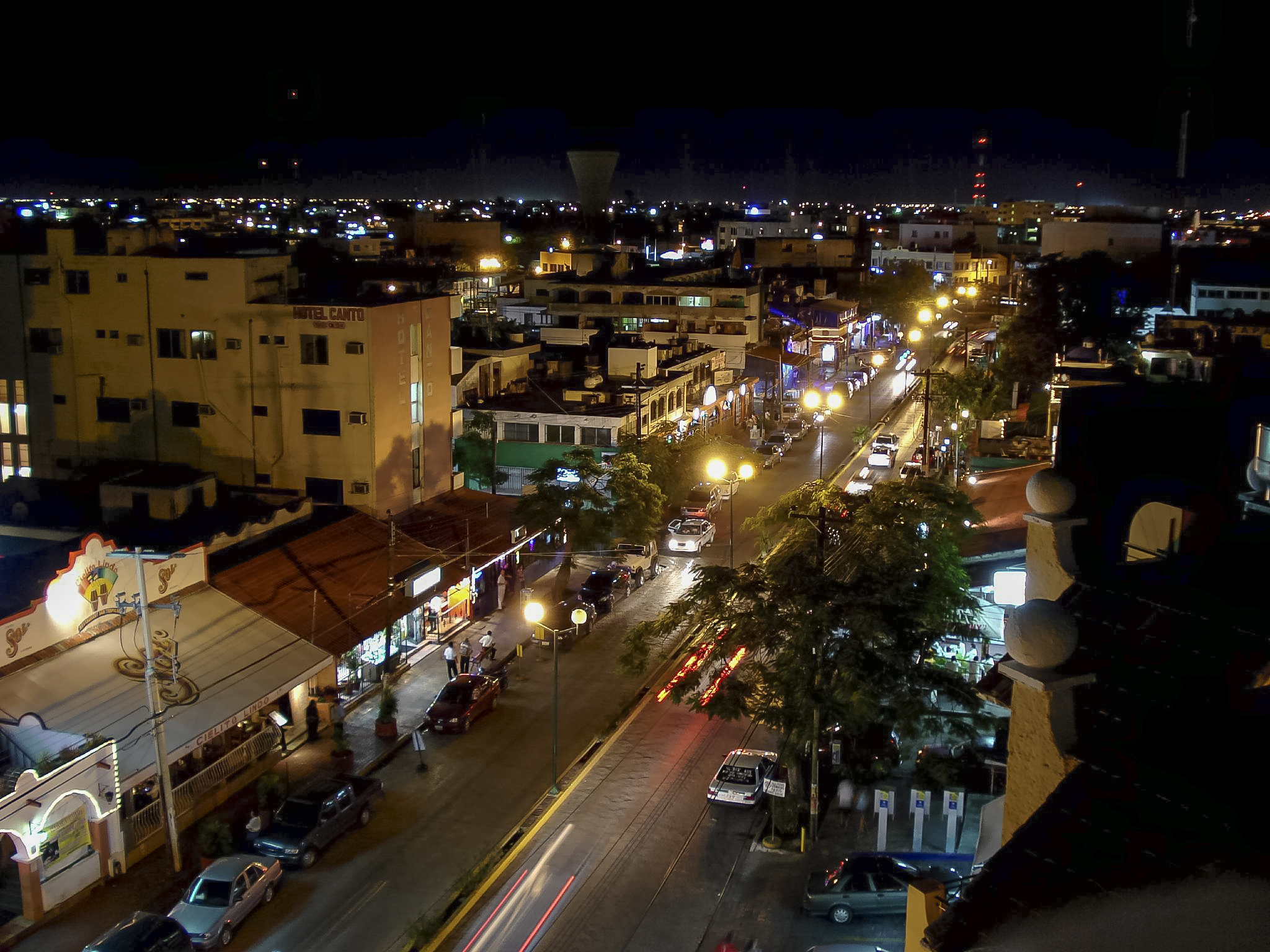
Avenida Yaxchilan

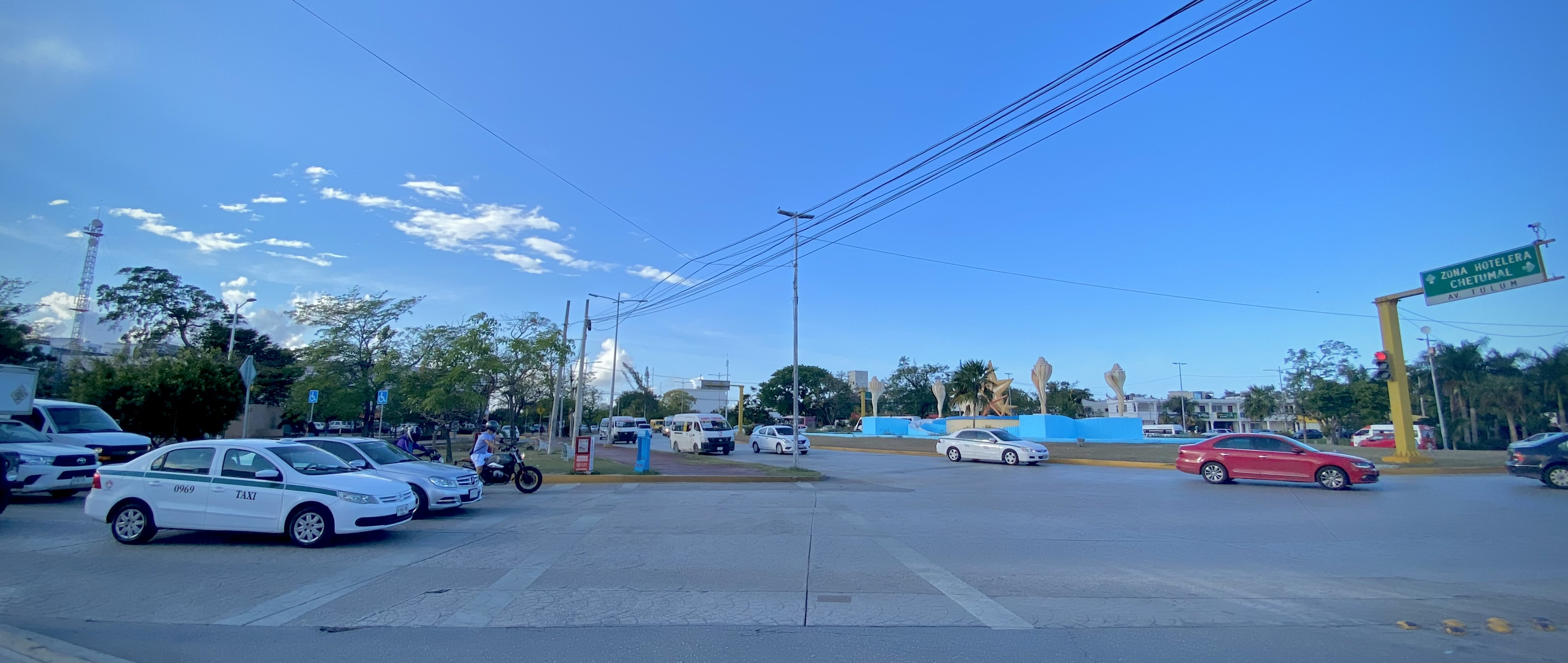
Avenida Tulum

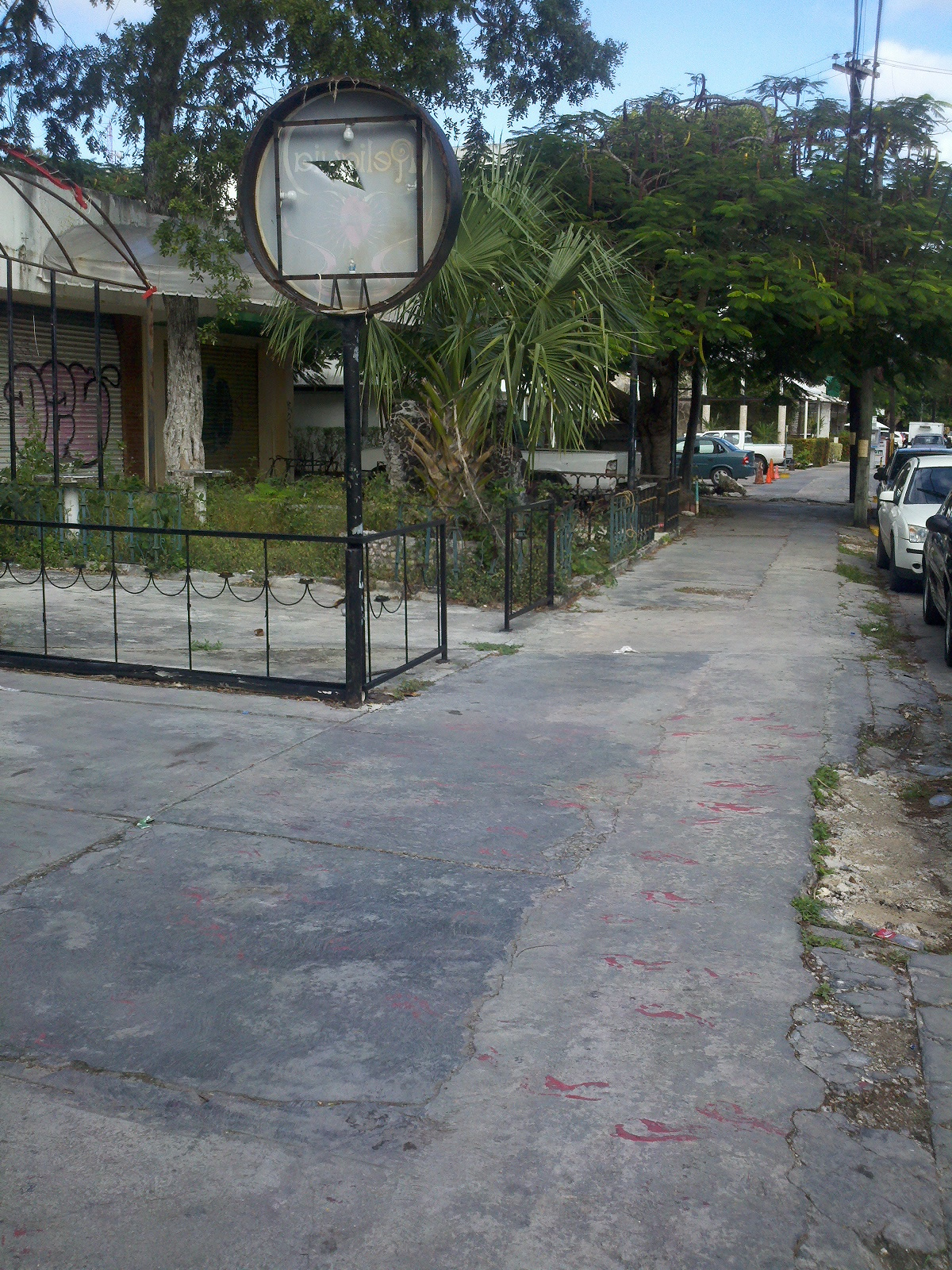
Example of abandoned, neglected building

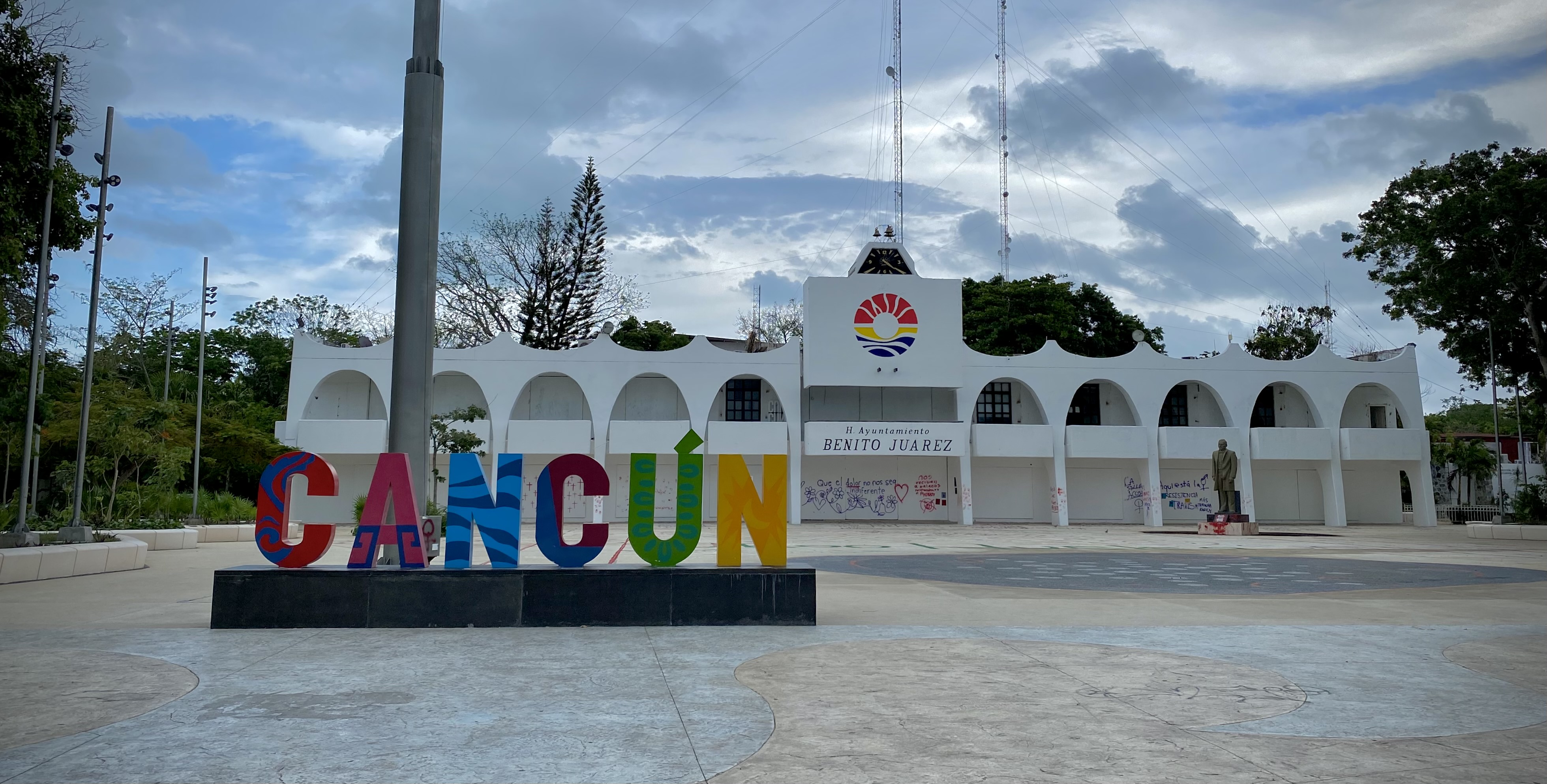
Benito Juárez Municipal Hall

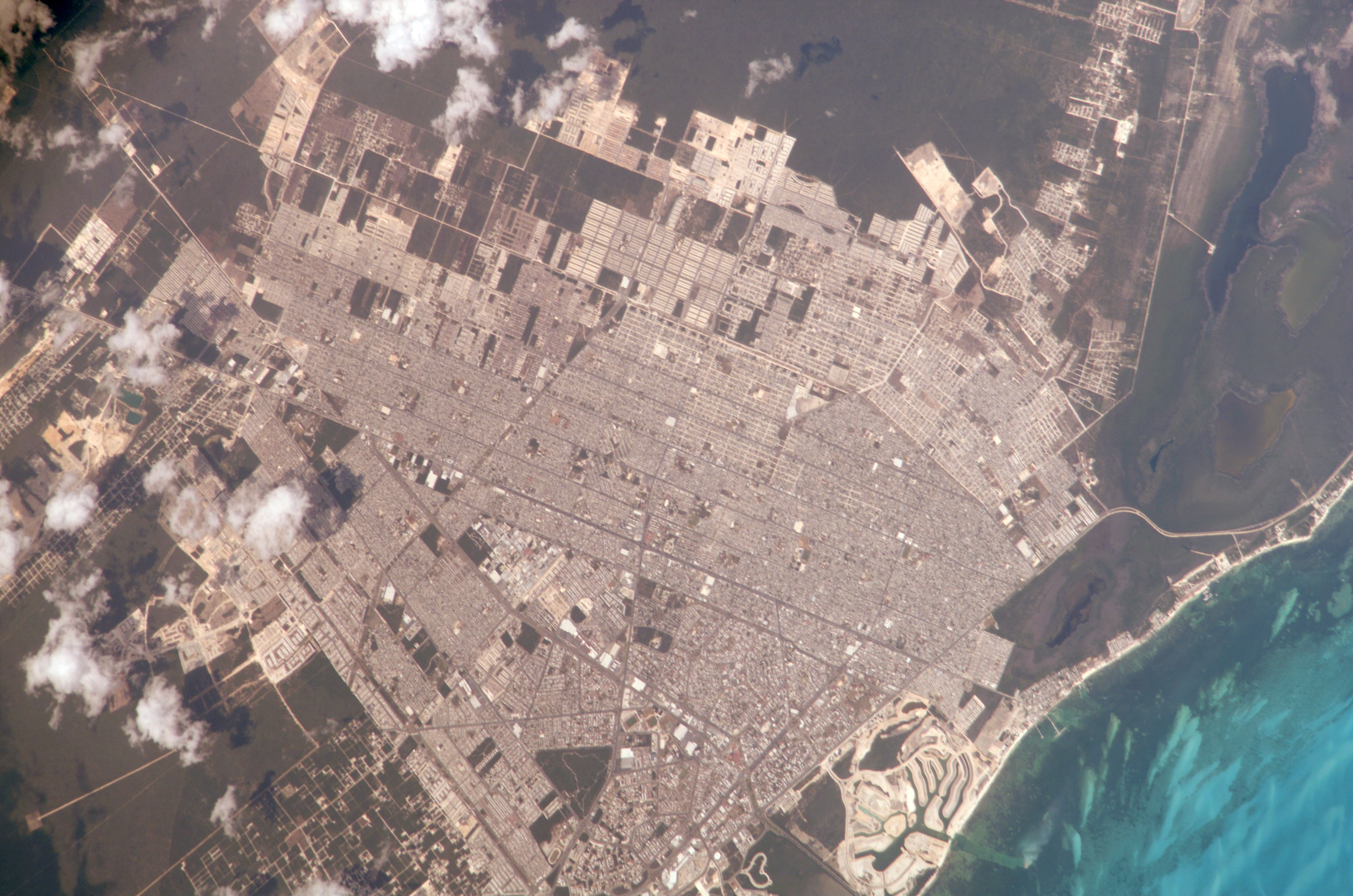
Downtown Cancún from the International Space Station

== See also ==
- Puerto Juárez, district of Cancún and original city settlement before Cancún was founded, northeast of downtown
- Puerto Cancún, adjacent planned community and district of Cancún
- Mercado 28, market in downtown
