= Earth Level =

In George Gurdjieff's Fourth Way school of thought, Earth Level or Planet Level refers to the level of the Law of Forty-eight on the Ray of Creation, meaning that forty-eight laws govern it.

It corresponds to the Gurdjieff hydrogen number 48 and the musical note mi. Moon Level precedes it and All Planets Level follows it.

== See also ==
- 48 (number)
