= Ray of Creation =

Esoteric cosmology diagram

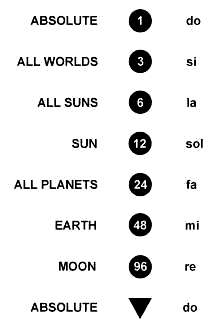
Ray of Creation

The Ray of Creation is an esoteric cosmology which was taught by G. I. Gurdjieff as part of his Fourth Way teaching. It is a diagram which better represents the place which Earth occupies in the Universe. The diagram has eight levels, each corresponding to Gurdjieff's Law of Octaves (see In Search of the Miraculous, chapter 7).

== Levels ==
The first level is "The Absolute", followed by "All Worlds", "All Suns", "Sun", "All Planets", "Earth", "Moon", and "The Absolute":

- The bottom of the cosmos, below life - "The Absolute"
- Earth's satellite - "The Moon"
- Our planet - "Earth"
- All of the planets in the Solar System to which Earth belongs to - "All Planets"
- The planets belong to the "Sun" or the Solar System
- The Sun belongs to the Milky Way galaxy or the "All Suns" combined
- All galaxies put together belong to "All Worlds"
- All Worlds form a final whole called "The Absolute"

This lineage indicates and compares the construction of all of the levels, matters, and laws of the Universe, placing them in scale with one another. Both levels called "The Absolute" reflect the will of God (in Fourth Way terms); the all-encompassing Absolute in that it is the undivided will of God from which creation branches out, and the bottom Absolute in that it is the final end or limit of creation's branching out.

== Laws ==
It was taught that in "The Absolute" the three holy forces form a whole, and thereby there is only one law (force) in the Absolute (which is the Will of the Absolute). The three forces of this law converge to form "All Worlds", whose level, now, being a part of the whole now has three laws. This level also having three forces, acts in creating "All Suns" in a similar process, and thereby "All Suns" has six laws (three new ones and three of the All Worlds level). Similarly, "Sun" has 12 laws, "All Planets" 24 laws, "Earth" 48 laws, "Moon" 96 laws, and "The Absolute" 192 laws.

Each level after the one-law Absolute has a bigger number of laws which govern it. Therefore, the further the level is away from the Absolute, the more mechanical the living things in it are. By this comparison it is claimed that there are 48 laws governing the life of living beings on Earth, thereby also claiming that the life on Earth is quite mechanical. Note that "The Absolute" mentioned here does not refer to God in conventional Christian terms, but as understood in terms of Gurdjieff's "esoteric Christianity" as he also called his Fourth Way teaching.

== Matter ==
Similarly to the difference of laws on each level, the level (in this case 'density') of matter differs in the same way. "The Absolute" has a matter density of one, "All Worlds" has a density of 3 (one atom of "All Worlds" has a three times the density as one atom of "The Absolute"), "All Suns" 6, "Sun" 12, "All Planets" 24, "Earth" 48, "Moon" 96, "The Absolute" (which in this case represents dead matter) 192.

This way everything in the universe according to this cosmology is classified as matter. (Note that even the matter of density 12 is too rarefied for contemporary science to classify it as matter.)

== Higher bodies ==
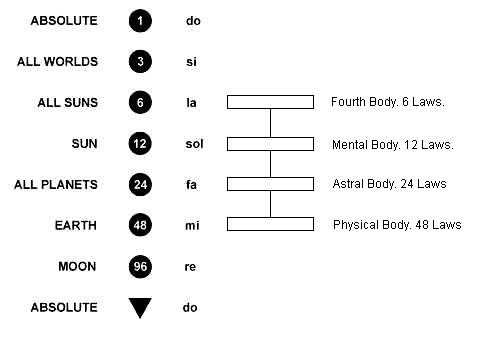
Higher bodies placed in the Ray of Creation

Gurdjieff's classification of Higher Bodies can be better represented on this scale. Physical body has the properties of the "Earth" level (that is, it has a density of 48 and it is subject to 48 laws). In comparison, a higher plane body would have a lighter density and it would be subject to a lesser number of laws (the amount varies on the level that the body falls under).

In the book Gnosis I, author Boris Mouravieff explains the names given to the notes of the solfege:

- DOminus (God)
- SIdereus orbis (Starry sky/Ensemble of all Worlds)
- LActeus orbis (the Milky Way)
- SOL (the Sun)
- FAtum (Fate: the Planetary World, with direct influence on human destiny)
- MIxtus orbis (the Earth, under the mixed rule of Good and Evil)
- REgina astris (the Moon, ruler of human fate)

The names of the notes have historically been attributed to the hymn 'Ut queant laxis' by Paulus Diaconus, where UT is used instead of DO. Mouravieff explains UT as indicating the uterus in the birth of flesh, and SI as representing "the door of the second Birth, according to the Spirit".

== Other properties ==
There are many properties which the Fourth Way relates to the Ray of Creation such as: the evolution of the substances in the Universe, relationship between the cosmoses and the human body, etc. Many of the properties of the law of octaves could be displayed using the Ray of Creation.

"Involution" describes the branching out of the Ray of Creation from the level of God to the most mechanical and law-bound, and processes going in that direction. "Evolution" describes processes going in the opposite direction, as in the goal of Fourth Way development to transcend the level of the physical body, as well as cosmic processes.

The law of octaves relates all processes which occur in time to the diatonic scale, ascribing a particular meaning to the intervals corresponding to the just diatonic semitone (a pitch ratio of 16:15). All vibrations are said to proceed with periodic unevenness corresponding to the diatonic scale.

== Ray of Creation in history ==
According to G. I. Gurdjieff, some of the ancient geocentric models don't represent an Earth-centered universe at all, but in reality display the Ray of Creation. This confusion was due to a lack of knowledge on the part of those examining the diagrams. Thus, the Ray of Creation is a part of ancient knowledge. Gurdjieff also claimed to have learned it in Asia and the Middle-East, during the end of the 19th century and the early part of the 20th century.

== See also ==
- G. I. Gurdjieff
- Earth Level
- Fourth Way Enneagram
- The Fourth Way
- Centers (Fourth Way)
