= Puerto Cancún =

- City district
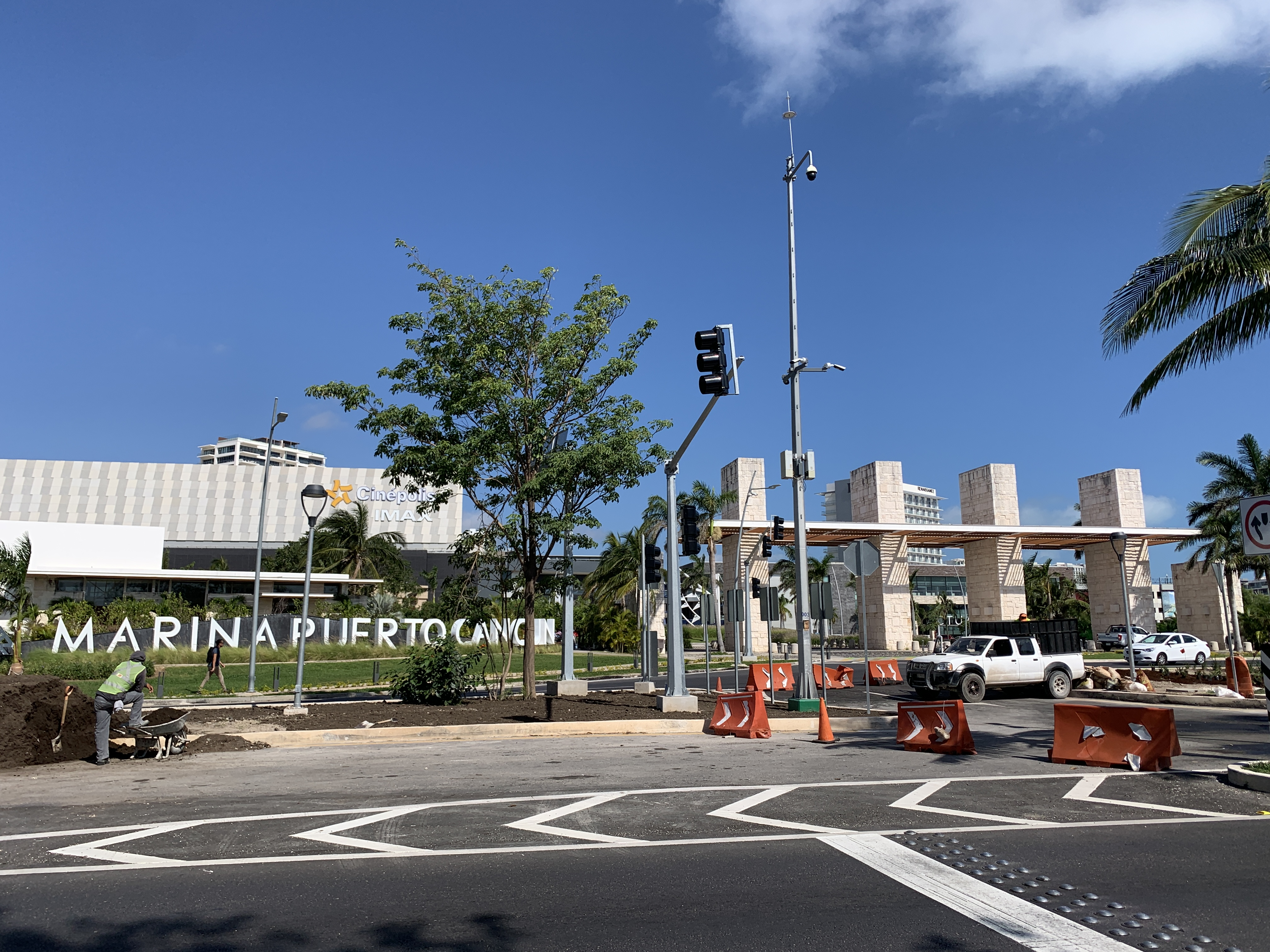
- Puerto Cancún entrance
- Interactive map of Puerto Cancún
- Coordinates: 21°09′38.3″N 86°48′28.6″W
- Country: Mexico
- State: Quintana Roo
- Municipality: Benito Juárez
- City: Cancún
- Established: 2013
- Website: puertocancun.com

Puerto Cancún is a 800-acre upscale development in Cancún next to the ocean that contains a marina, private canals, a shopping mall, an IMAX theater, a golf course, hotels, condominiums, and spaces for retail businesses. The multimillion-dollar development project was originated as a partnership between Fondo Nacional de Fomento al Turismo (Fonatur), Mexico's National Trust Fund for Tourism Development, and Michael Eugene Kelly, the CEO, president and principal promoter who had been convicted of a Ponzi scheme. It had been advertised in 2010 as a continuing development and gated community offering luxury and security.

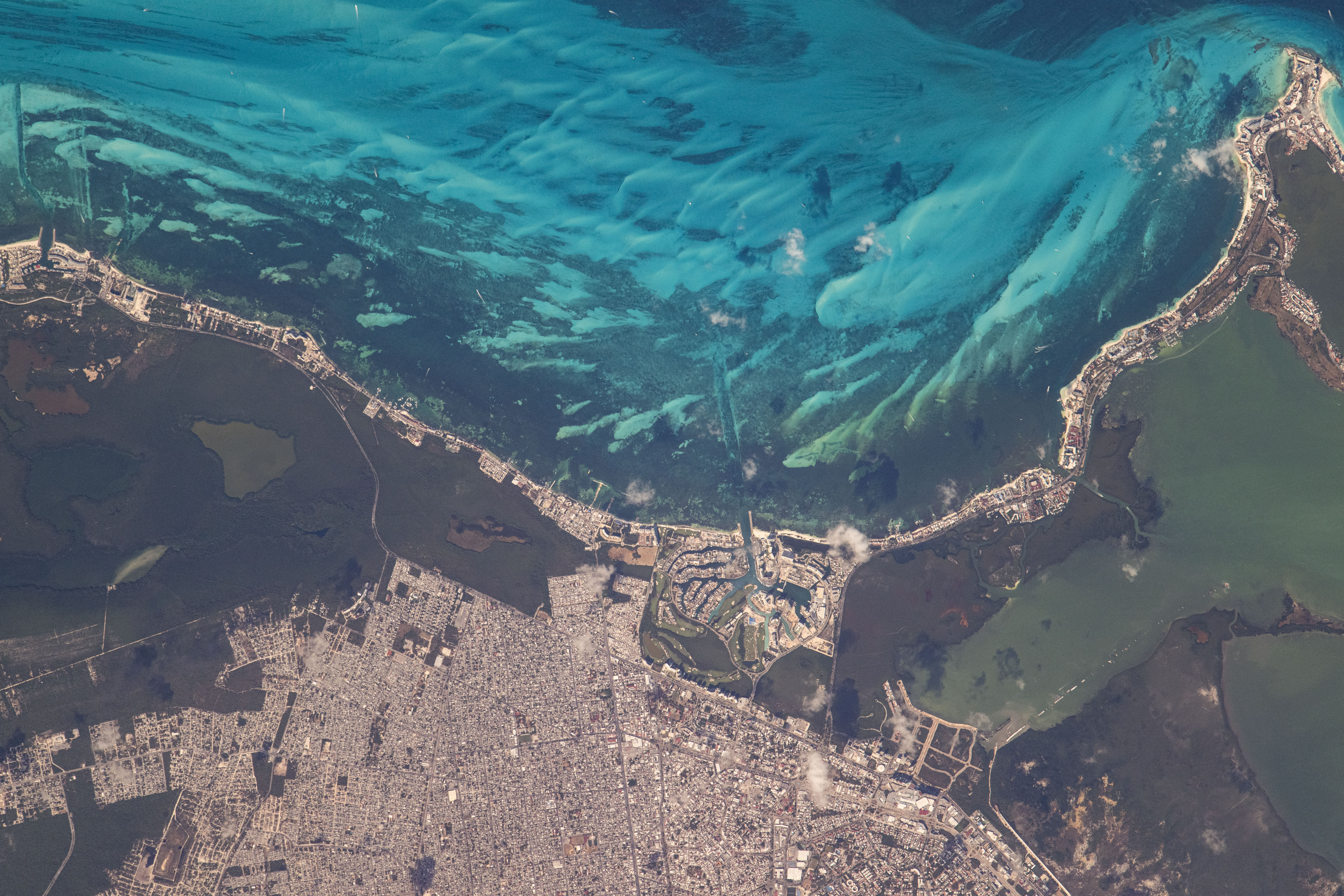
Satellite view of Puerto Cancún (center)

The Puerto Cancún development was designed by the EDSA and Humberto Artigas as a master planned resort community with a variety of living options. Guests can vacation at the resort for short term stays at the hotels, purchase a time-share, or buy a their own residence, with the option of purchasing a building lot to build a home to their own specifications. The development provides a variety of amenities for guests and homeowners, including a golf course designed by Tom Weiskopf, a 270-acre ecological reserve, a full-service marina, a club house with a spa, family areas, adult and children’s pools, and full beach access. Due to ongoing construction, not all amenities may be available at this time.

== See also ==
- Puerto Juárez, original settlement in Cancún
- Downtown Cancún, district of Cancún
- Hotel Zone, main tourist area in Cancún and its boundary extends to Puerto Cancún
