= Plaza Las Américas (Cancún) =

Shopping mall in Cancún, Mexico

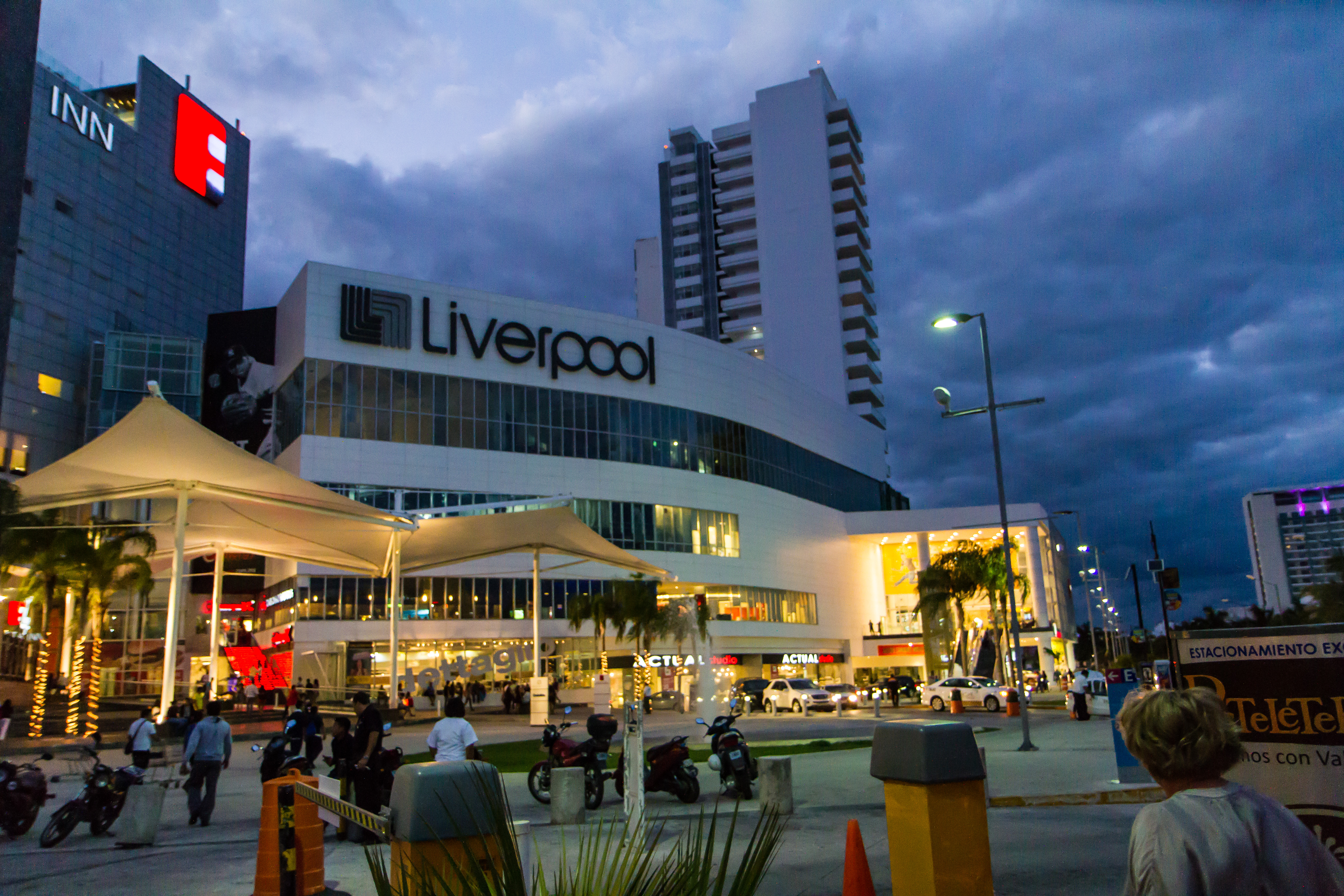
- Location: Av. Tulum Sur Supermanzana 7, Cancún; Quintana Roo Mexico
- Coordinates: 21.1471696°N 86.8239404°W
- Opened: 1998
- Num. of stores: 234
- Num. of anchor tenants: 8
- Floors: 3
- Website: www.lasamericascentrocomercial.com.mx

Plaza Las Américas in Cancún, Quintana Roo state, Mexico is the largest shopping center in Cancún and opened in 1998. It now includes residential towers Torres de las Américas atop a second shopping area Malecón Américas.

Anchors include 2 Liverpool department stores (fashion and home stores), Sears, Chedraui hypermarket, Cinépolis, Fiesta Inn hotel, Coppel junior department store, and Sanborns junior department store and restaurant. There is also an iShopMixup - twin electronics and music stores.

== Transportation ==
Creating adequate space for the pickup and drop-off of private municipal bus transit passengers has been an ongoing problem.

== Gallery ==
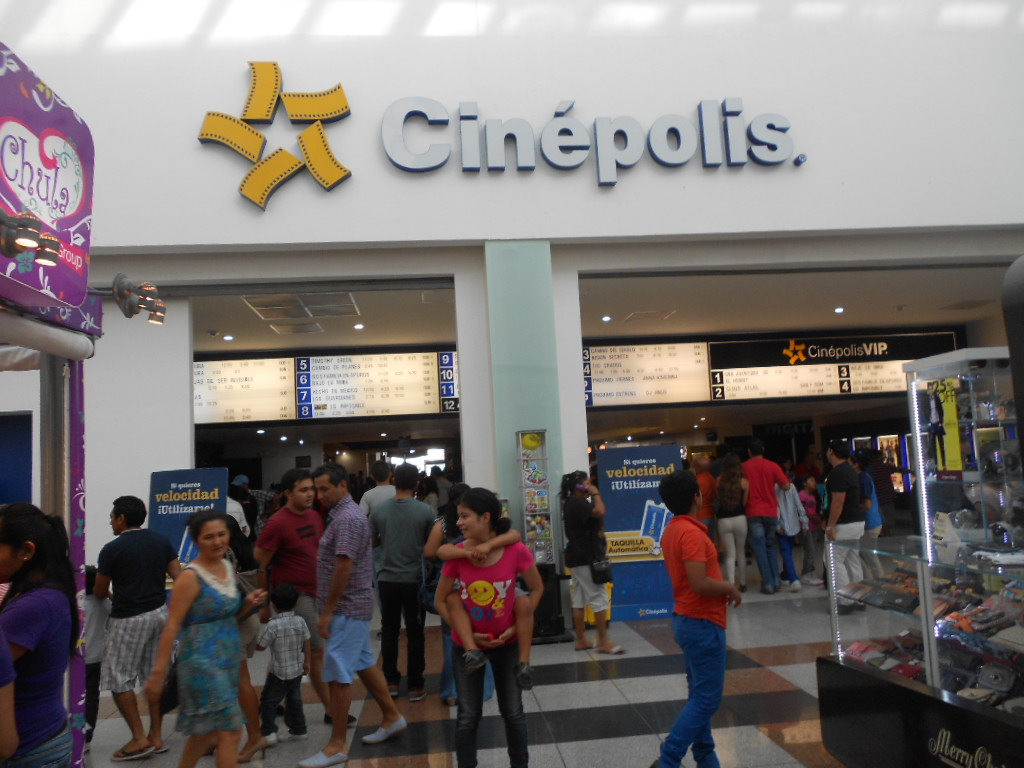
Cinépolis at Plaza Las Américas, Cancún

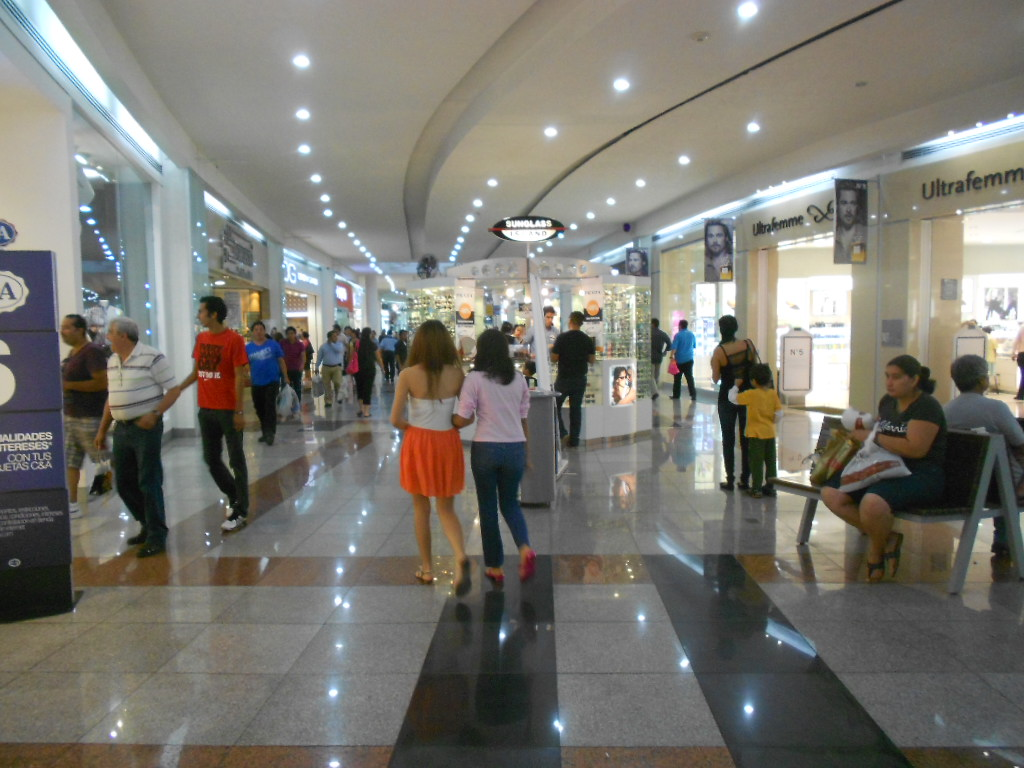
Wing of Plaza Las Américas, Cancún

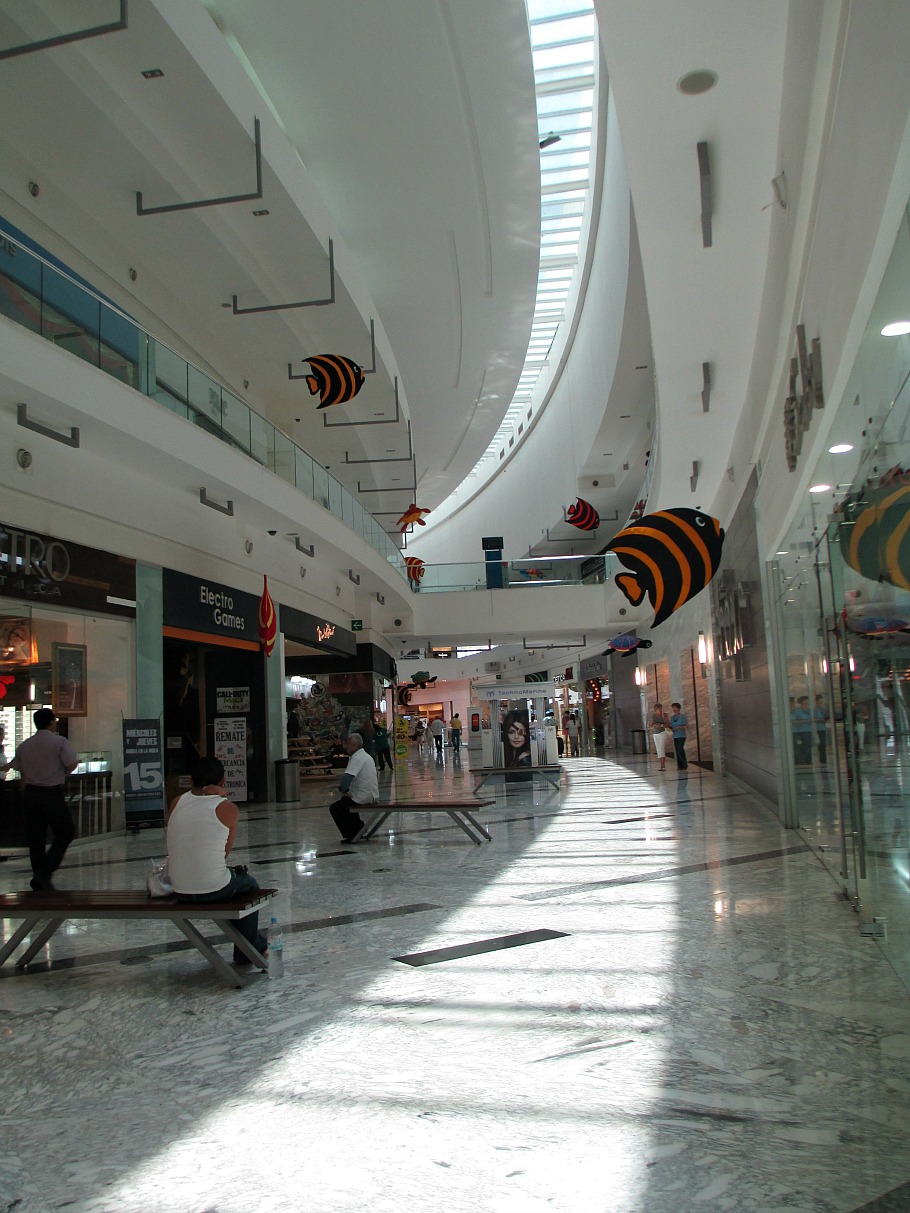
Shopping corridor

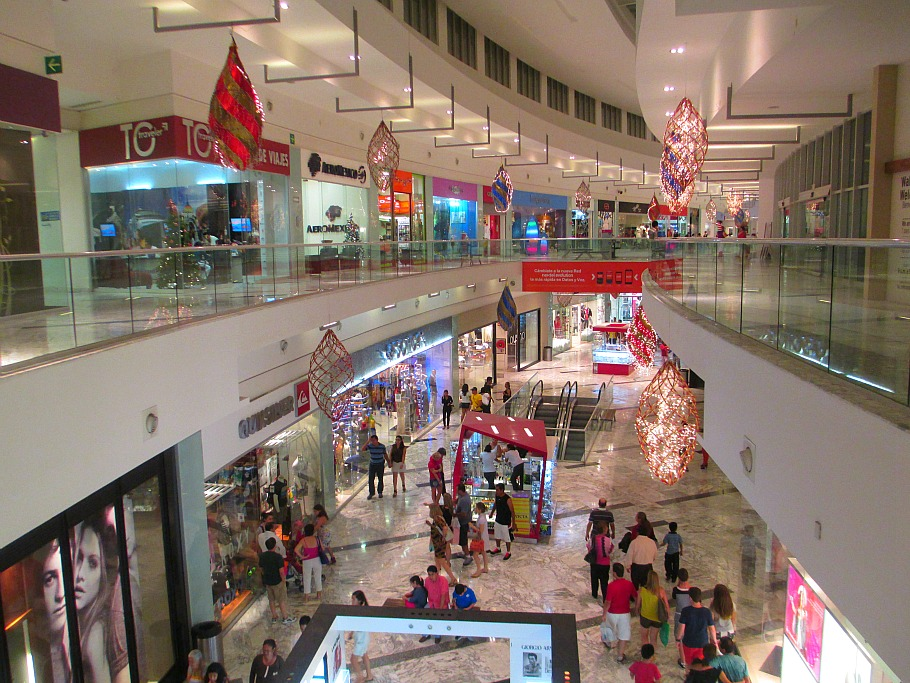
Balcony view of the shops

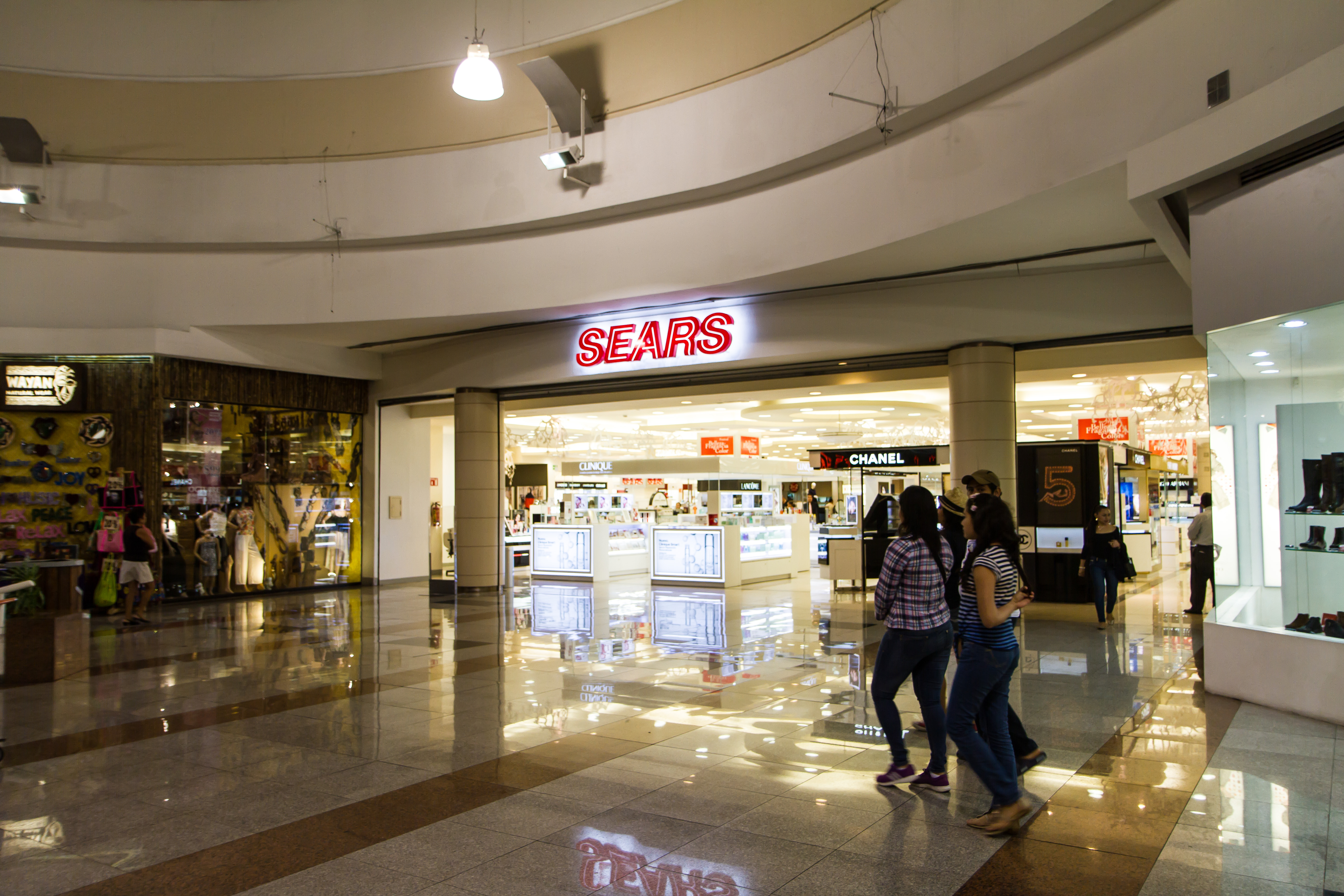
Sears Mexico store

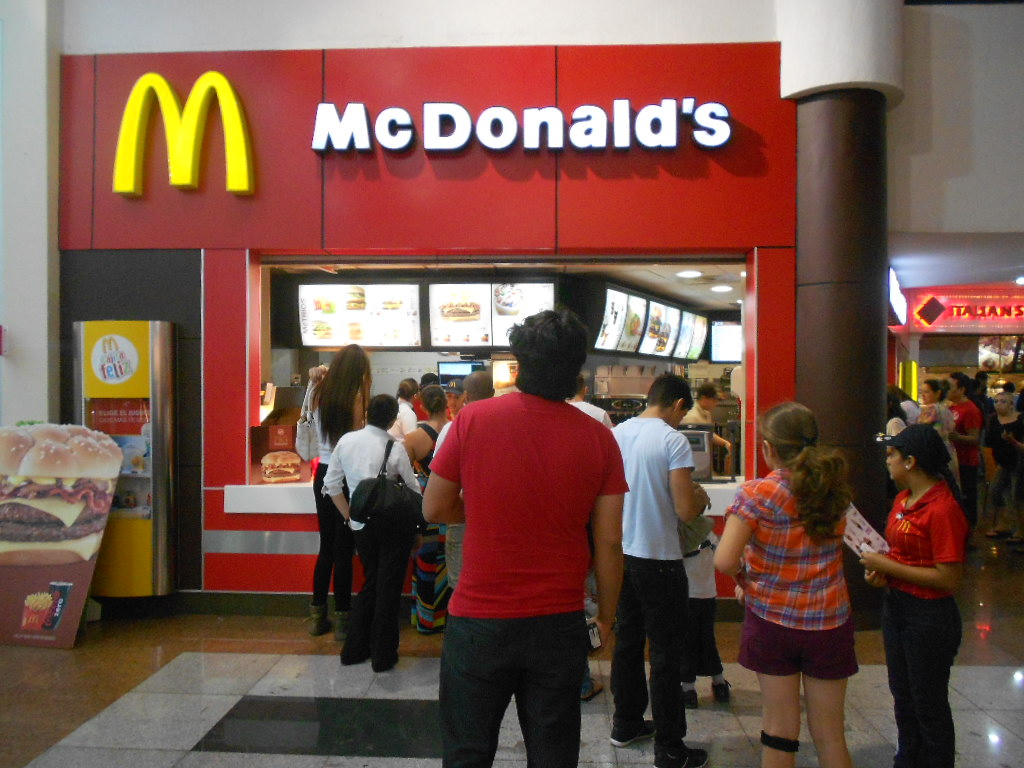
McDonald's in food court

== See also ==
- Mercado 28
