= Mercado 28 =

Coordinates: 21.161°N 86.834°W

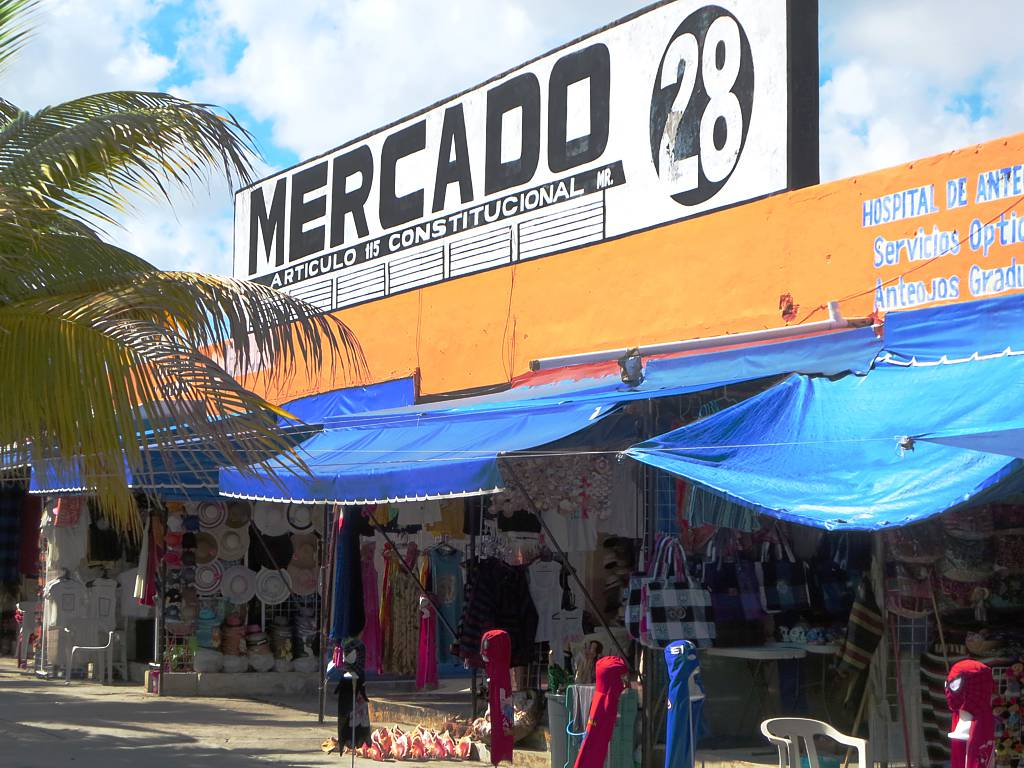
Mercado 28

Mercado 28 (English: Market 28) is an open-air market located in downtown Cancún, Quintana Roo, Mexico. Established in the 1980s, it has become a local cultural and commercial landmark, attracting both locals and tourists seeking Mexican crafts.

== History ==
Mercado 28 originated in the 1980s as a traditional market offering a variety of goods, including fruits, vegetables, meats, seafood, Yucatecan cuisine, and local handicrafts. In the mid-1990s, following an economic crisis, the market underwent a transformation, shifting its focus predominantly to the sale of handicrafts. In 2024, there was an effort to revitalize the market and boost visitors. At that time, about 3000 to 3500 people visited the market each day.

== Location and accessibility ==
Mercado 28 is situated in downtown Cancún, approximately 2 kilometers from the Hotel Zone. It is accessible by public transportation, including the R2 bus, which connects the Hotel Zone to downtown Cancún. Visitors can also reach the market by taxi or on foot from nearby attractions such as Parque Las Palapas and the ADO bus station.

== See also ==
- Plaza Las Américas (Cancún)
- Traditional markets in Mexico
