= Centers (Fourth Way) =

Separate apparatuses within a being that dictate its specific functions

In G.I. Gurdjieff's Fourth Way teaching, also known as The Work, centers or brains refer to separate apparatuses within a being that dictate its specific functions. According to this teaching, there are three main centers: intellectual, emotional, and moving. These centers in the human body are analogous to a three-storey factory, the intellectual center being the top storey, the emotional center being the middle one, and the moving center being the bottom storey. The moving center, or the bottom storey is further divided into three separate functions: sex, instinctive, and motor.

Gurdjieff classified plants as having one brain, animals two and humans three brains. In Beelzebub's Tales to His Grandson, Gurdjieff greatly expanded his idea of humans as "three brained beings".

In the book The Fourth Way, Ouspensky refers to the "center of gravity" as being a center which different people primarily operate from (intellectuals, artists, and sports enthusiasts, for example, might represent each of these centers).

== Centers ==
According to the teaching:

=== Lower centers ===
==== Moving center ====
Also termed the physical center. This brain is located in the spinal column. This brain makes beings capable of physical actions. Some, but not all, Fourth Way schools have further divided this Center into three distinct parts:

- Motor: Controls motor functions. The acts of walking, the physical aspects of talking, as well as even functions that are considered "reflexive," are all part of this sub-center.
- Instinctive: Controls faculties which are completely involuntary. This does not typically encompass "knee-jerk" reactions, nor what we would typically consider reflexes. A common example of the functioning of this center is the contracting of blood vessels to facilitate the pumping of blood.
- Sexual: Controls sexual functions.

==== Emotional center ====
Also termed the feeling center. This faculty makes beings capable of feeling emotions. This brain is dispersed throughout the human body as nerves which have been labeled as the "nerve nodes" . The biggest concentration of these nerves is in the solar plexus.

==== Intellectual center ====
Also termed the thinking center. This center is the faculty which makes a being capable of logic and reasoning. It is located in the head.

=== Higher centers ===
While the lower centers are considered separate faculties of one's material body, one can think of these higher centers as being faculties for "higher bodies".

==== Higher emotional center ====
A faculty of the astral body. It enables one to have sustained states of self-consciousness, self-awareness, and other deep feelings. It does not replace, nor is it an "upgraded" version of the emotional center, as it is a completely separate center.

==== Higher intellectual center ====
A faculty of the mental body. It enables one to have sustained states of objective consciousness and superior intellect. As above, it does not replace, nor is it an "upgraded" version of the intellectual center.

=== Subtle bodies ===
The Fourth Way says that there are four possible bodies of man, composed of increasingly rarefied matter, interpenetrating one another; all people have the first body, while the other three are obtained through the correct type of effort.

==== The material body ====
The normal human physical body. This is considered the seat of the lower five centers: intellectual, emotional, physical, instinctual, and sexual. The material body's actions are purely automatic and depend completely on the influences coming from outside factors, and its perception is confined to observation in a "subjective" manner. On the Ray of Creation Gurdjieff indicated to Ouspensky that the physical body is on the level of the Earth and subject to the same number of laws (48). When the material body dies, then it returns to the earth from which it came, and nothing of it remains.

==== The astral body ====
This body is also sometimes called the emotional body or the Kesdjan body. This body, by itself is not subject to the laws of automativity; that is to say, the astral body is capable of a degree of free will. Also, the perceptions of the astral body are capable of being of an objective nature in matters regarding one's self. An astral body is considered a prerequisite to maintaining a state of "self-consciousness". On the Ray of Creation Gurdjieff indicated to Ouspensky that this body is on the level of All Planets and subject to the same number of laws (24). The lifespan of the astral body is unknown exactly, but it is far larger than the lifespan of the Material Body because it continues living after the death of the material body. According to the Fourth Way, a man is not born with an astral body and an average man does not have one, while even if someone does, it is in a very immature state, and has no contact with it whatsoever in his daily life.

==== The intellectual body ====
This body, by itself is not subject to the laws of automation; that is to say, the intellectual body is capable of a degree of free will beyond that of the astral body. Also, the perceptions of the intellectual body are capable of being of an objective nature in matters regarding both one's self, and things outside of one's self. An intellectual body is considered a prerequisite to maintaining a state of "objective consciousness" which is the fourth possible state of man. On the Ray of Creation Gurdjieff indicated to Ouspensky that this "mental body" is on the level of the Sun and subject to the same number of laws (12). The lifespan of the intellectual body is also rather incalculable. According to Gurdjieff, an average man does not have one.

==== The causal body ====
On the Ray of Creation Gurdjieff indicated to Ouspensky that this "fourth body" is on the level of All Suns and subject to the same number of laws (6).

== Types of attention ==
One important aspect of the study of centers is the types of attention. The Work teaches that there are three types of attention possible for each of the centers:

- no attention/wandering attention
- attention held by the object
- attention held by effort; directed attention

The Work teaches that the higher bodies discussed above are only a possibility for man. In order to form higher bodies, the correct type of effort is required. Directing dispassionate attention to each of the centers (also known as "self observation"), is one such effort. Wandering attention, or attention held by an object, are insufficient for true self-observation. They are also insufficient for obtaining free will, which is one component of the higher bodies. Wandering attention and attention held by the object are sufficient for the first body, the Material Body. In other words, the Material Body does not need directed attention in order to function and fulfill its role in the Ray of Creation.

== Importance in the Fourth Way ==
In the Fourth Way, study of the centers is an important part of self-development. Students of that path must observe themselves. Study of the centers gives a framework and context for two things:

- What to observe. In the Fourth Way, dispassionate self-observation must begin somewhere. The study of centers gives students a place to begin.
- What is actually being observed. When observations are made, students may frame the observations using the concept of "the centers." For example, a student may observe an increased heart rate and increased respirations while watching a sporting event. In Fourth Way terminology, the student might say, "The body had a definite reaction when the team made the touchdown." Placing self observations within the language of the centers helps students become dispassionate about what they observe, or, to use Fourth Way terminology further, it helps students "not identify" with what they observe.

== See also ==
- Fourth Way Enneagram
