= Centro Direzionale =

Centro Direzionale may refer to various business districts in Italy:

- Centro direzionale di Napoli, Naples
- Centro Direzionale di Milano, Milan
