= Centro, Yucatán =

Centro
- Region
- Interactive map of Centro
- Coordinates: 20.9679°N 89.6287°W
- Country: Mexico
- State: Yucatán
- Time zone: UTC−6 (CST)

Centro is one of the regions of Yucatán, Mexico. Mérida is the capital of Yucatán, Mexico, and it is located in the central part of the state. It was home to the Mayas. Centro Yucatán is the third municipal region of the State of Yucatán.

== Language ==
The Maya language is the second most commonly used and or spoken in Yucatán. Per the (INEGI 2004) census estimated number of Maya speakers is over 800,000.

== Climate ==
Based on studies done throughout the period of 1985-2015, the average climate is high 91 Fahrenheit, low 71 Fahrenheit. The hottest month is May and coldest is January.
