= Center Hill =

Center Hill can refer to several places in the United States:

- Center Hill, Atlanta
- Center Hill, Florida
- Center Hill, Mississippi
- Center Hill, North Carolina
- Center Hill, Texas
- Center Hill Lake, a reservoir in Tennessee
