= Centre Academy East Anglia =

Private school in Brettenham, Suffolk, England

Location
- Brettenham, Suffolk, IP7 7QR; England; 52°09′05″N 0°52′28″E

Information
- Type: Private independent school
- Religious affiliation: Christian/Secular
- Established: 1981
- Local authority: Suffolk
- Department for Education URN: 124890 Tables
- Ofsted: Reports
- Head of School: L Gilbert
- Staff: Read on website
- Gender: Coeducational
- Age: 6 to 19 (16 after 2025)
- Enrolment: 50-70
- Houses: Furlong, Ottywill, Old Rectory and Saint Mary’s
- Publication: CAEA Newsletter, published at the end of every term
- Website: http://www.centreacademy.net/

Centre Academy East Anglia, formerly known as The Old Rectory School is a private school in Brettenham, Suffolk, England, founded in 1981.

It caters to SEND students co-educationally in small class sizes adopting a nurturing approach.

The headmistress is Lisa Gilbert.

The school was previously able to offer boarding but now is day only.
