= Centro Tampa =

Centro Tampa (previously known as Centro Mi Diario) is a weekly Spanish-language tabloid published in Tampa, Florida, by Times Publishing Company, a company that also owns The Tampa Bay Times and tbt*.

CENTRO Tampa began publication on October 21, 2005. Currently, it is the largest Spanish-language newspaper in Tampa Bay with a circulation of more than 50,000. Since 2007, the publication has been audited by the Audit Bureau of Circulations (ABC).
