= Puerto Juárez =

- City district
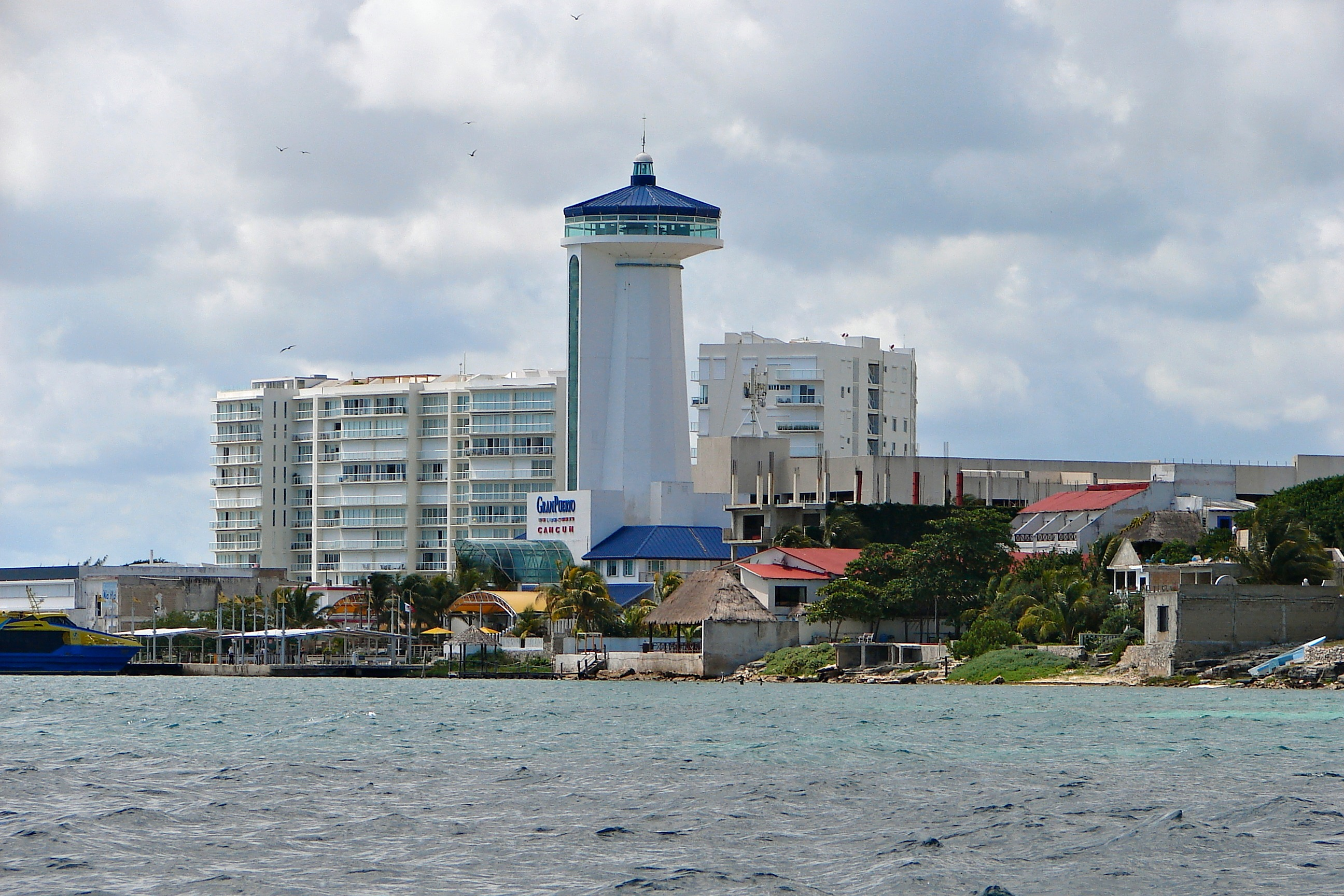
- Gran Puerto port in Puerto Juárez
- Interactive map of Puerto Juárez
- Coordinates: 21°10′56.6″N 86°48′31.4″W
- Country: Mexico
- State: Quintana Roo
- Municipality: Benito Juárez
- City: Cancún

Population (2020)
  - Total: 320

Puerto Juárez is a district in the Benito Juárez municipality, in the Mexican state of Quintana Roo. It is in the north-east of the Yucatán Peninsula, on the shore of the Caribbean Sea, 2 km (1.25 mi) north from the center of Cancún. Puerto Juárez was the primary location of the original population of the area before the founding of the city of Cancún, and was a separate location from 1960 until 1990 when it was abolished as such and incorporated as one of Cancún's districts.

== Ferry ==
Gran Puerto is the ferry port located in Puerto Juárez. It serves as a primary way to access Isla Mujeres, an island around 10 km (6 mi) from Puerto Juárez, from Cancún. The regular ferry service runs twice an hour on the high-speed ferry Ultramar. The ferry terminal has two lines for Ultramar passengers, restrooms, a parking garage, convenience store, and ticketing area.

== See also ==
- Puerto Cancún, upscale residential development in Cancún
- Downtown Cancún, district of Cancún
- Hotel Zone, main tourist destination in Cancún
