= Ana Patricia Peralta de la Peña =

Mexican politician (born 1990)

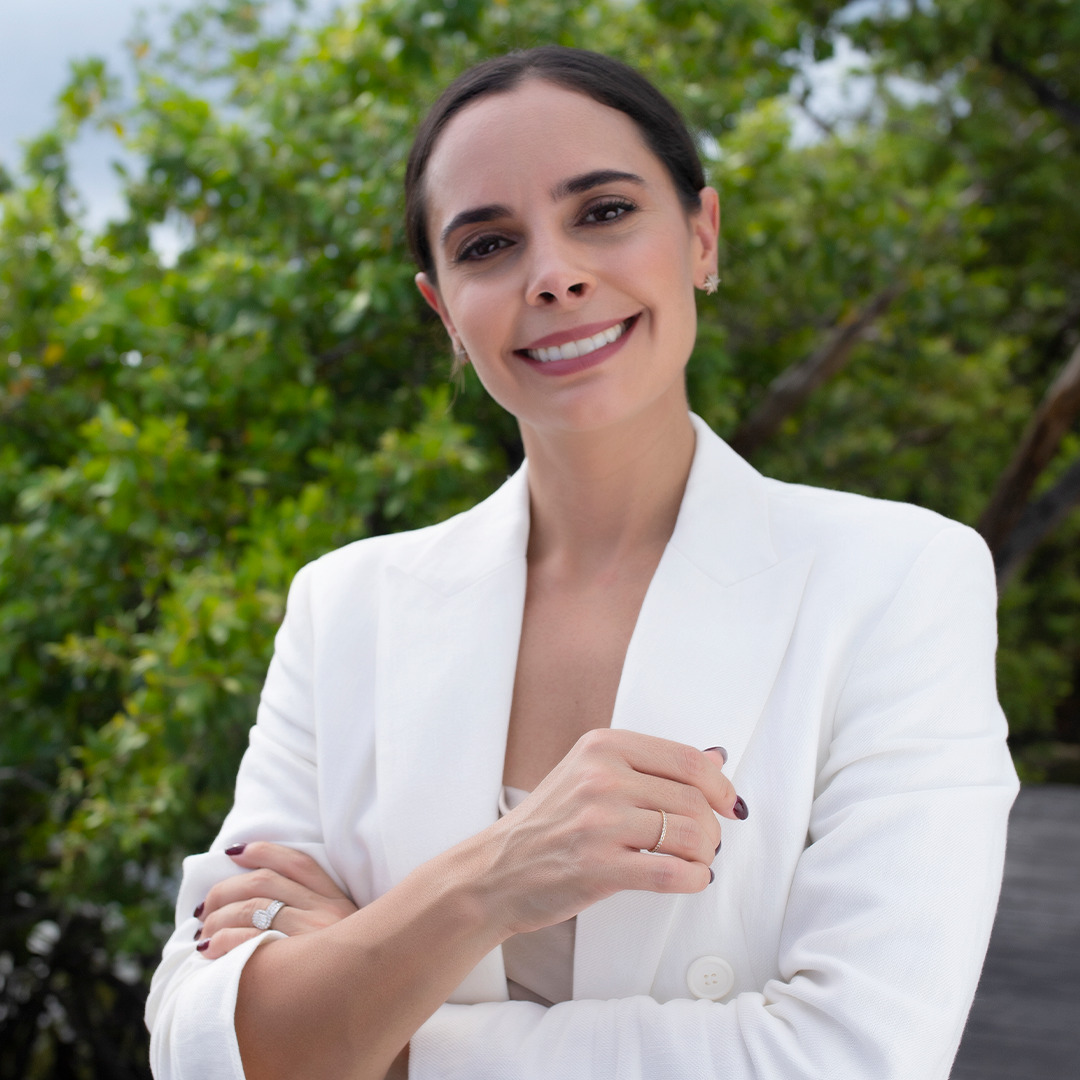
- Peralta in 2022

Member of the Chamber of Deputies
- In office 1 September 2018 – 31 August 2021
- Constituency: Third electoral region

Personal details
- Born: 24 June 1990 (age 36)
- Party: Morena (since 2018)

Ana Patricia Peralta de la Peña (born 24 June 1990) is a Mexican politician serving as municipal president of Benito Juárez, Quintana Roo, since 2022. From 2018 to 2021, she was a plurinominal member of the Chamber of Deputies. From 2016 to 2018, she was a member of the Congress of Quintana Roo.

She is a member of the National Regeneration Movement (Morena).
