= El Centro (TV series) =

2025 Spanish television series

The centre (in Spanish, El Centro) is a Spanish internet television series of thriller and drama created by David Moreno for Movistar Plus+. Produced by Fonte Films, it stars an ensemble cast including Juan Diego Botto, Elena Martín Gimeno, Elisabet Casanovas, Clara Segura, Tristán Ulloa, Kimberley Tell, Israel Elejalde, David Lorente and Nacho Sánchez. It premiered on Movistar Plus+ on 9 October 2025. The name of the series refers to Spain's 'National Intelligence Centre' (CNI). The author was able to access the centre and its documentation when creating the script.

On 25 November 2025, Movistar Plus+ renewed El Centro for a second season.

== Plot summary ==
When a murder reveals an international operation by the Russian intelligence services, a group of CNI agents are sent on a race against time to thwart the plot. To make matters worse, they also have to deal with a mole hidden within their own ranks.

== Cast ==
=== Main ===
- Juan Diego Botto as Vicente Alfaro "Michelín"
- Elena Martín as Elsa Díaz Prieto
- Elisabet Casanovas as Belén Navas
- David Lorente as Iñaki Olano (Episode 2 - Episode 6)
- Israel Elejalde as Marcos Porto "Marqués"
- Kimberley Tell as Marta Sierra Alcázar (Episode 3 - Episode 6)
- Nacho Sánchez as Juan Sánchez (Episode 2 - Episode 6)
- Clara Segura as Aitana Huarte
- Tristán Ulloa as Enrique Adaro Montero (Episode 2 - Episode 6)

=== Recurring ===
- Daniel Jumillas as Izan Martínez
- Pull Filipovic like Alexander Volkov
- María Morales as Marisa
- Carla Domínguez as Laura Alfaro (Episode 1; Episode 4 - Episode 6)
- Miriam Queba as Nuria (Episode 2 - Episode 3; Episode 5 - Episode 6)
- Alberto Jo Lee as Romay (Episode 2 - Episode 6)
- Jorge Rueda as Caliph (Episode 2 - Episode 3; Episode 5 - Episode 6)
- Ana Villa as María (Episode 2 - Episode 6)
- Óscar Lasarte as Gerardo (Episode 2 - Episode 3; Episode 5)
- Higinio Berzosa as Father of Marqués (Episode 2 - Episode 5)
- Ainhoa Aldanondo as Alicia (Episode 2; Episode 4 - Episode 6)
- Iñigo de la Iglesia as Telmo (Episode 3 - Episode 5)
- Orencio Ortega as Canales (Episode 3 - Episode 5)
- Mae Porta as Paula Adaro Sierra (Episode 3 - Episode 6)
- Amber Williams as Hackman (Episode 4 - Episode 6)
- Ken Appledorn as Gregory Dully (Episode 4 – Episode 6)

=== Guest ===
- Óscar de la Fuente as Raúl Crespo (Episode 1)
- Iván Marcos as Javier "Javi" Morata Pedreira (Episode 1)
- Anna Mayo as Carolina Loreño (Episode 1 - Episode 2)
- Juan Sánchez as Eloy Urrokoetxea Romero (Episode 1 - Episode 2)
- Luis Vivanco as Pedro Jesús Navarro "Colonel Watusi" (Episode 1)
- José Roberto Díaz as Gonzalo Abreu (Episode 1)
- Clairet Hernández as Antonia (Episode 1)
- Jazz Vilá as Huertas (Episode 1)
- Mercedes Eizaga as Sara (Episode 2)
- Jaime Riba as Miguel (Episode 2 - Episode 3)
- Olivia Delcán as Patricia (Episode 3 - Episode 4)
- Jons Pappila as Karol (Episode 3)
- Manuel Sánchez as José Francisco (Episode 3 - Episode 4)
- Brendan McNamee as Peter Caine (Episode 5 - Episode 6)
- Tito Asorey as Adaro's solicitor (Episode 4)
- Yoima Valdés as Gabriela Arenas (Episode 4)

== Episodes ==
N.º	Title	Directed by	Written by	Original release date
1	"Crespo"	David Ulloa	David Moreno	9 October 2025
2	"Elsa"	David Ulloa	David Moreno	9 October 2025
3	"Adaro"	David Ulloa	David Moreno and Raúl López	9 October 2025
4	"Marked"	David Ulloa	David Moreno and Raúl López	9 October 2025
5	"Telmo"	David Ulloa	David Moreno, Raúl López and Eva Saiz	9 October 2025
6	"Hackman"	David Ulloa	David Moreno, Raúl López and Eva Saiz	9 October 2025

== Production ==
During the presentation of its upcoming Spanish series in October 2024, Movistar Plus+ announced El Centro as one of the new crime thrillers in development for the platform. Juan Diego Botto, Tristán Ulloa, Elena Martín Gimeno, Clara Segura and Elisabet Casanovas were announced as the lead actors in the series. At the end of October, it was announced that filming for the series had begun in Madrid.

On 18 June 2025, it was announced that El Centro would have its world premiere at the South International Series Festival on 12 September 2025 as the festival's opening series. On 9 September 2025, Movistar Plus+ released the trailer for El Centro and scheduled its premiere on the platform for 9 October 2025.

On 25 November 2025, Movistar Plus+ announced on social media that El Centro had been renewed for a second season.
