= Centre Avenue =

Centre Avenue or Center Avenue may refer to:

- Centre Avenue station, a Long Island Rail Road station in East Rockaway, New York, U.S.
- Centre Avenue (Pittsburgh), Pennsylvania, U.S.
- Center Avenue Neighborhood Residential District, Bay City, Michigan, U.S.
