= Benito Juárez Municipality, Quintana Roo =

Municipality in Mexico

Benito Juarez
- Municipality
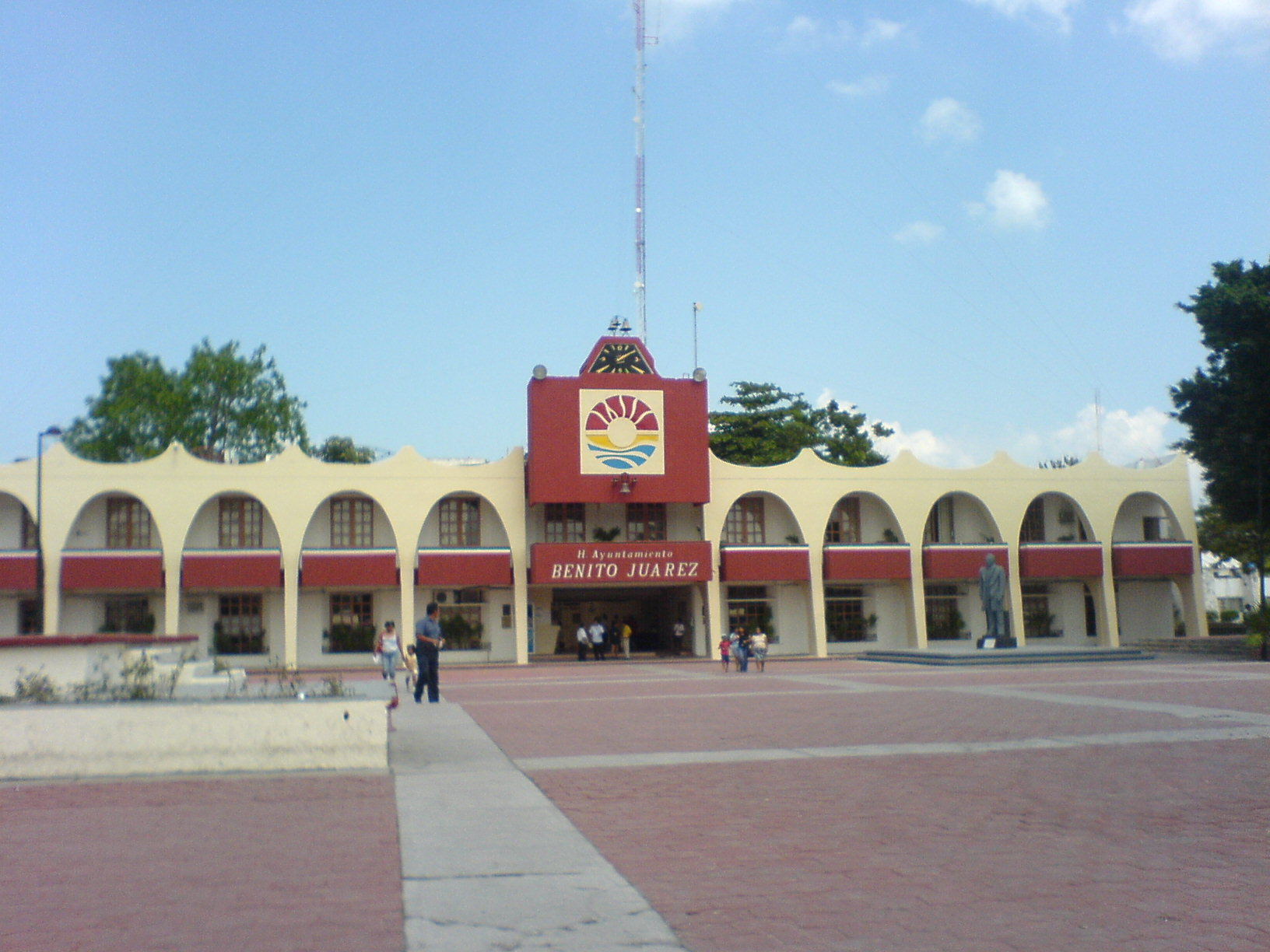
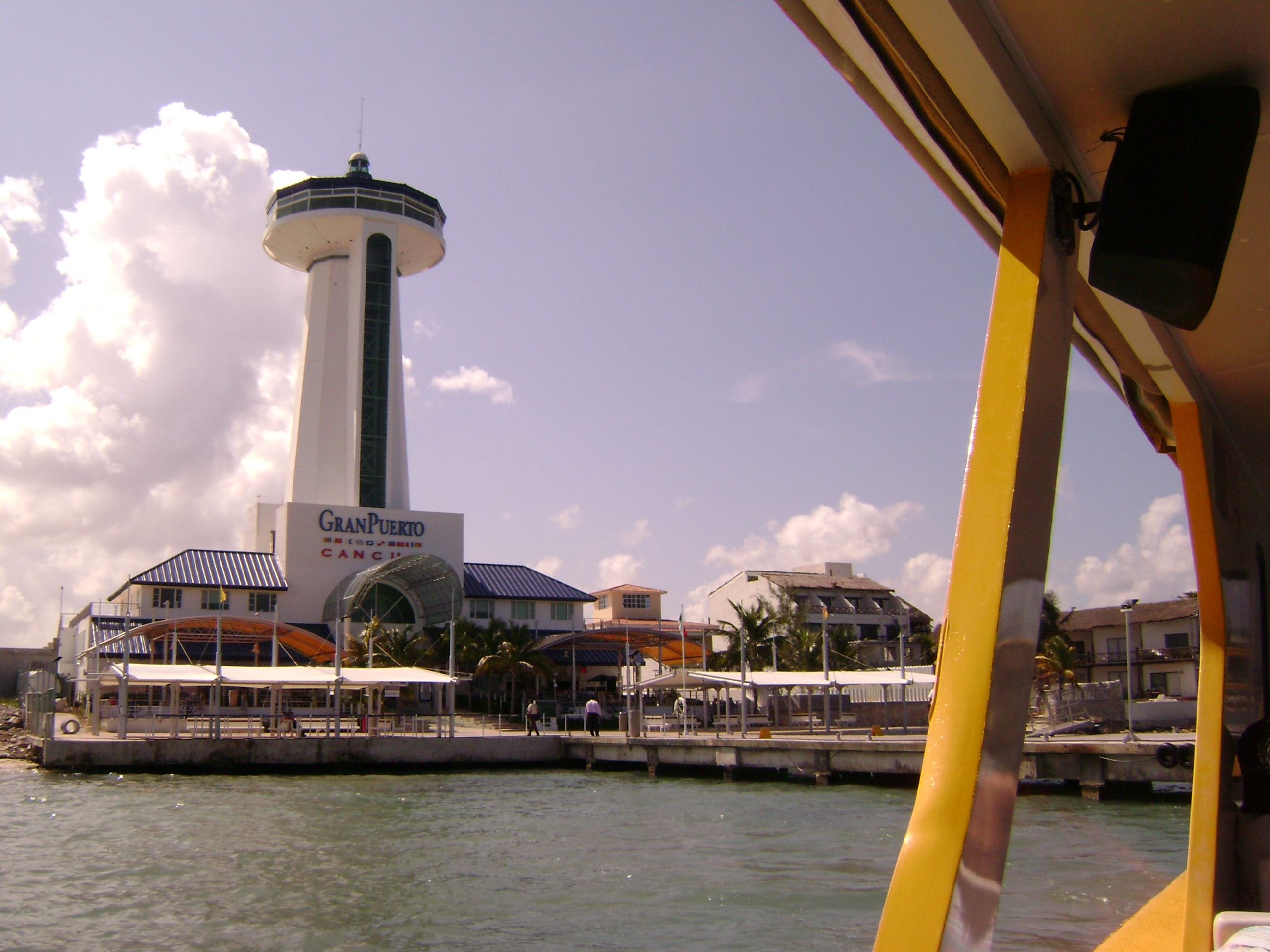
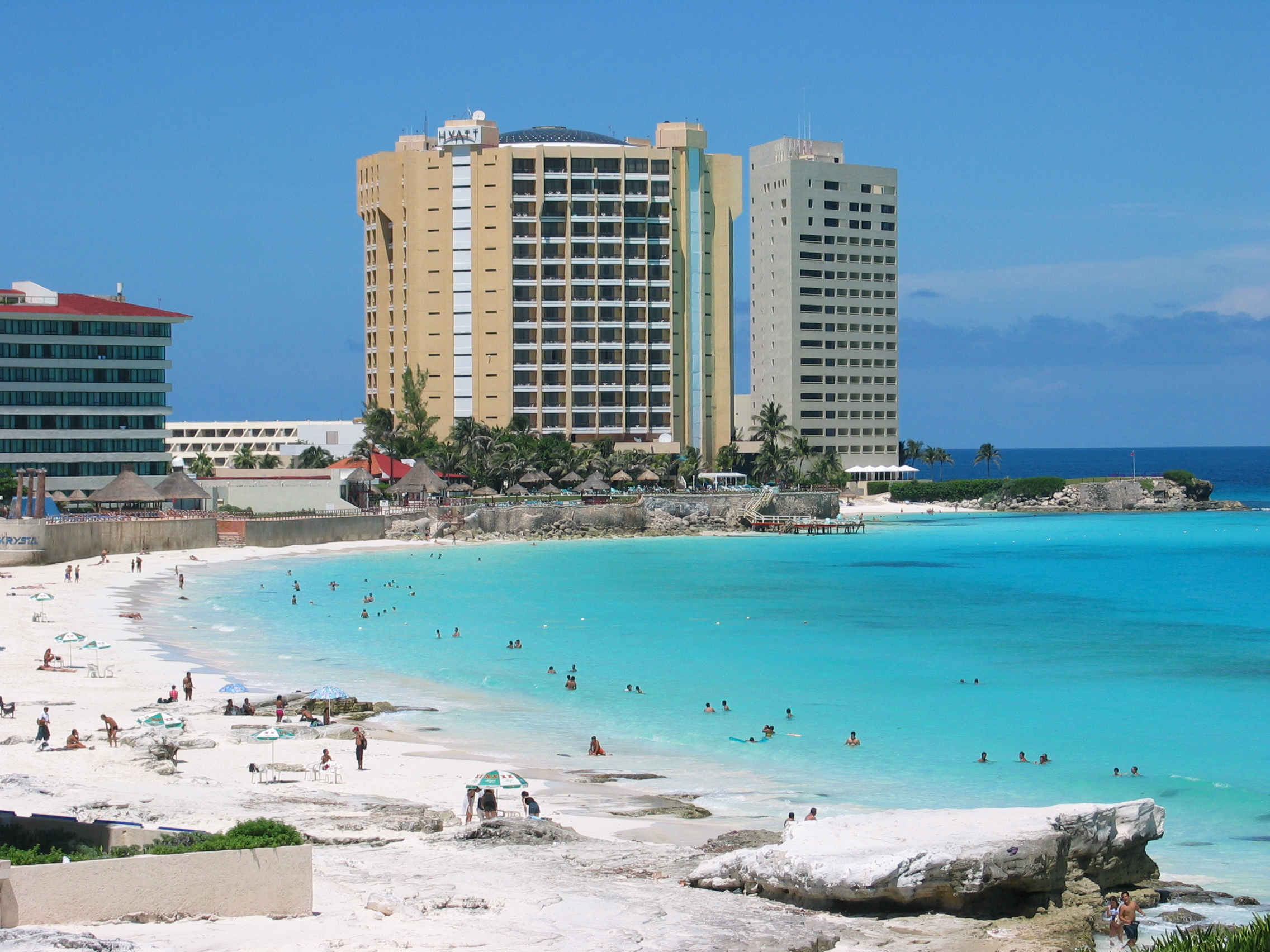
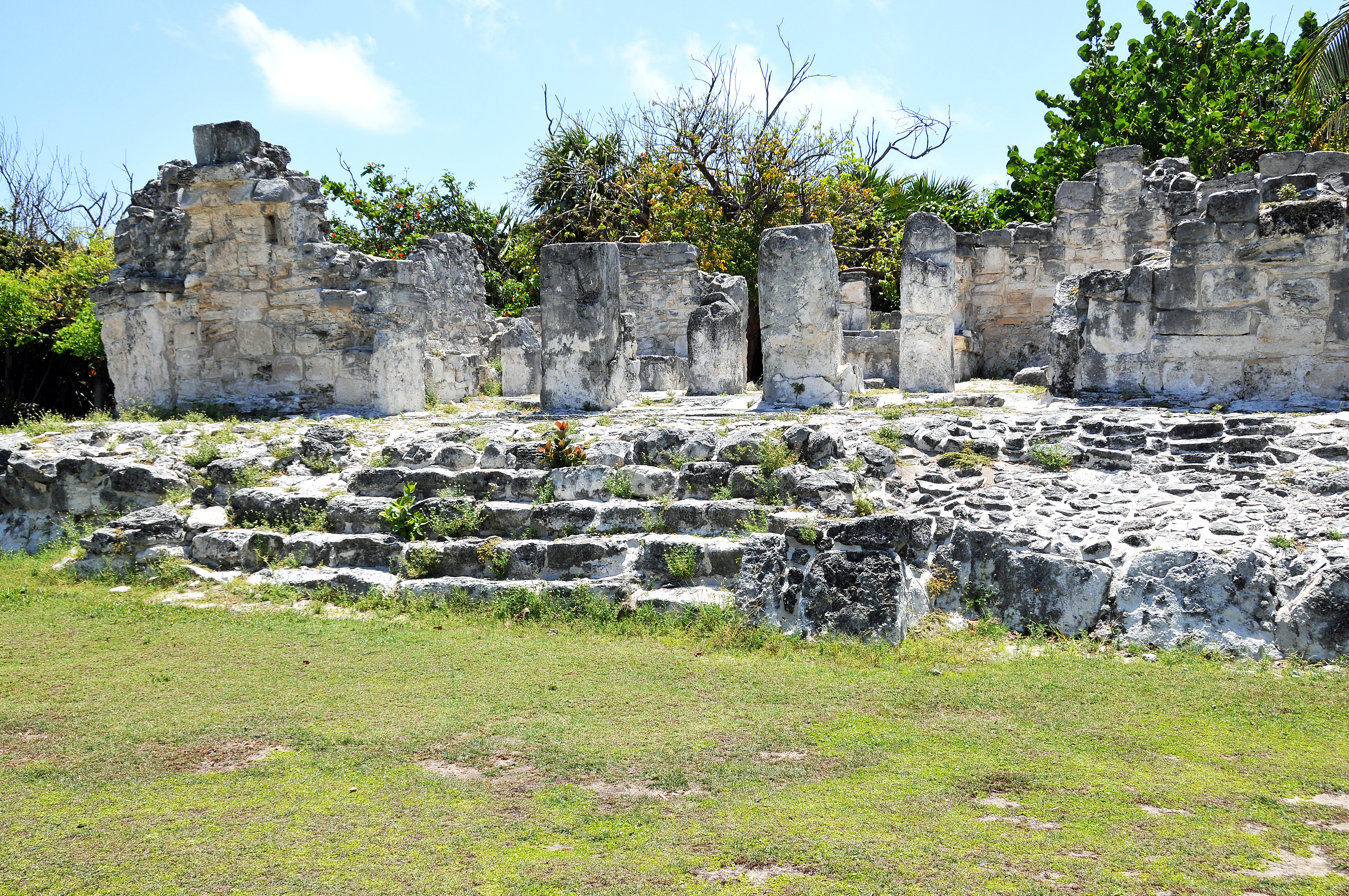
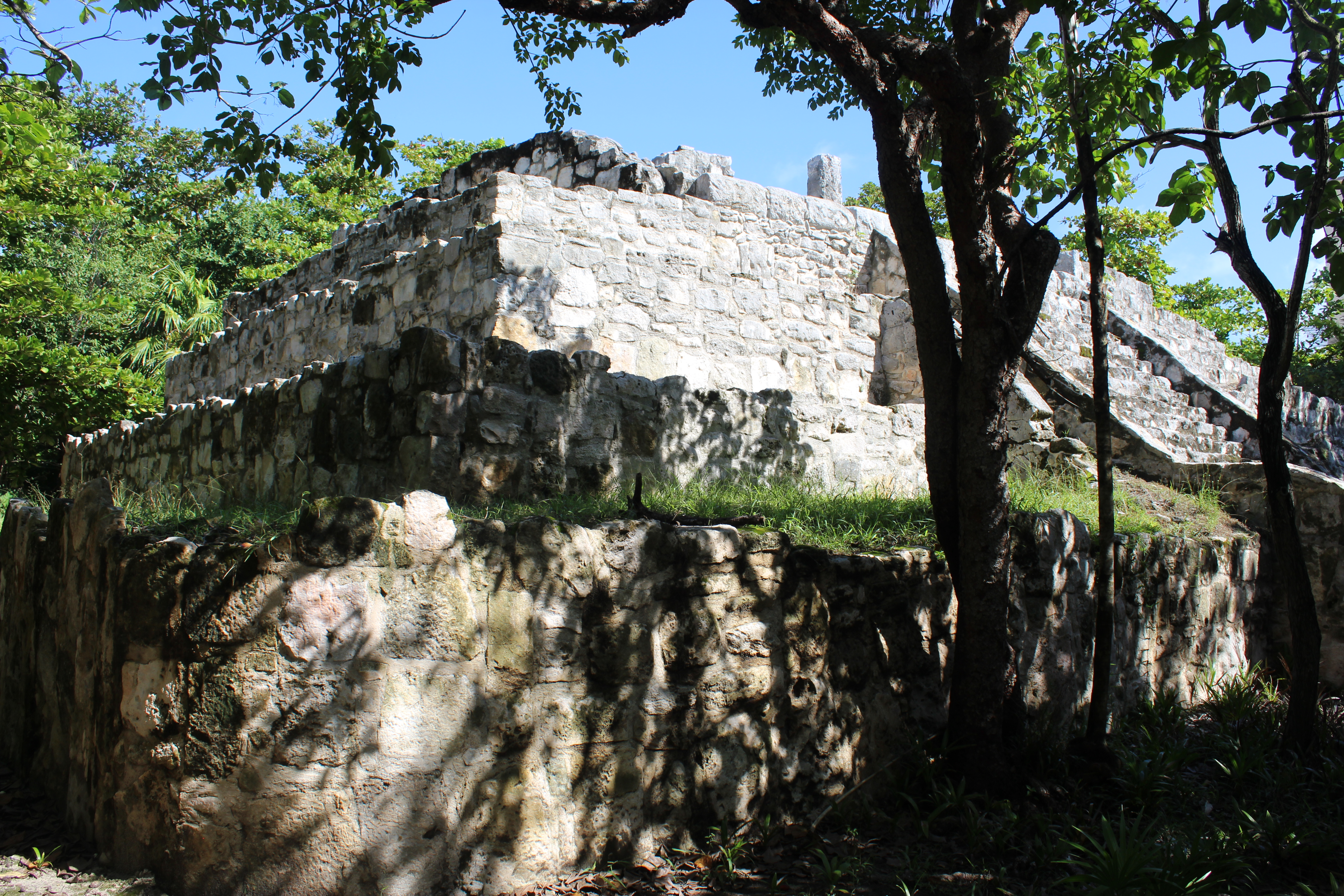
- Top: Benito Juárez Municipal Hall; Middle: Puerto Juárez, Cancún Hotel Zone; Bottom: El Rey Archaeological Zone, San Miguelito Archaeological Zone

- Flag

- Location of Benito Juarez in Quintana Roo

- Location of Benito Juarez in Mexico
- Coordinates: 21°00′N 87°00′W
- Country: Mexico
- State: Quintana Roo
- Established: 1975
- Named for: Benito Juárez
- Municipal seat: Cancún

Government
  - Municipal President: Ana Patricia Peralta de la Peña (MORENA)

Area
  - Total: 930.7 km^{2} (359.3 sq mi)
- Elevation: 10 m (33 ft)

Population (2020)
  - Total: 911,503
  - Density: 979.4/km^{2} (2,537/sq mi)
  - Seat: 888,797
- Time zone: UTC−05:00 (Zona Sureste)
- INEGI Code: 23005
- Website: cancun.gob.mx

Benito Juárez is one of the eleven municipalities of the Mexican state of Quintana Roo. Most of its population reside in the municipal seat, Cancún. It is named after the 19th century president and statesman Benito Juárez.

== Geography ==
Benito Juárez is located in the north of the state with the Caribbean Sea as its eastern border. It borders on the municipalities of Isla Mujeres to the north, Puerto Morelos to the south, and Lázaro Cárdenas to the west. The municipality covers an area 1,664 square kilometres (642 sq mi) which is 3.72% of the territory of the state.

=== Communities ===
The 2020 census enumerated 295 populated localities and 272 unpopulated localities. The largest are as follows:

Map of Benito Juárez municipality

Community	Population (2010)
Cancún	888,797
Alfredo V. Bonfil	19,789
Lagos del Sol	1,021
El Porvenir	625
Colonia Chiapaneca Siglo XXI	281
Entire municipality	911,503

Puerto Juárez, the primary location of the original population of the area before the founding of the city of Cancún, was considered a separate location from 1960 until 1990, when it was abolished as such and incorporated as one of Cancún's districts.

== History ==
The Mayan culture occupied the territory and they are still subsisting. In Cancún are different types of archeological monuments like "Ruinas de el Rey". At the time the town of Cancún was founded (1902) the majority of its business activity was the production and export gum and "palo de tinte". They transported it to Puerto Morelos for the translation to Cozumel and from there it was exported to other countries.

After World War II gum production dropped. In the 1960s, other commercial activities were started. In the 1960s the "island of Cancún" was only occupied at certain times of the year, however by 1974 the first hotel was opened in what is now known as the Hotel Zone. This was also the year Quintana Roo that was recognized as a state. At the time Benito Juarez was founded, it was part the Isla Mujeres territory and received municipality status one year later in 1975.

In 2016, the municipality of Puerto Morelos was split off from Benito Juárez.

== Demographics ==
Historical population
Year	Pop.	±% p.a.
1995	311,696	—
2000	419,815	+6.14%
2005	572,973	+6.42%
2010	661,176	+2.91%
2020	911,503	+3.26%
Source: INEGI Instituto Nacional de Estadística y Geografía

== Economy ==
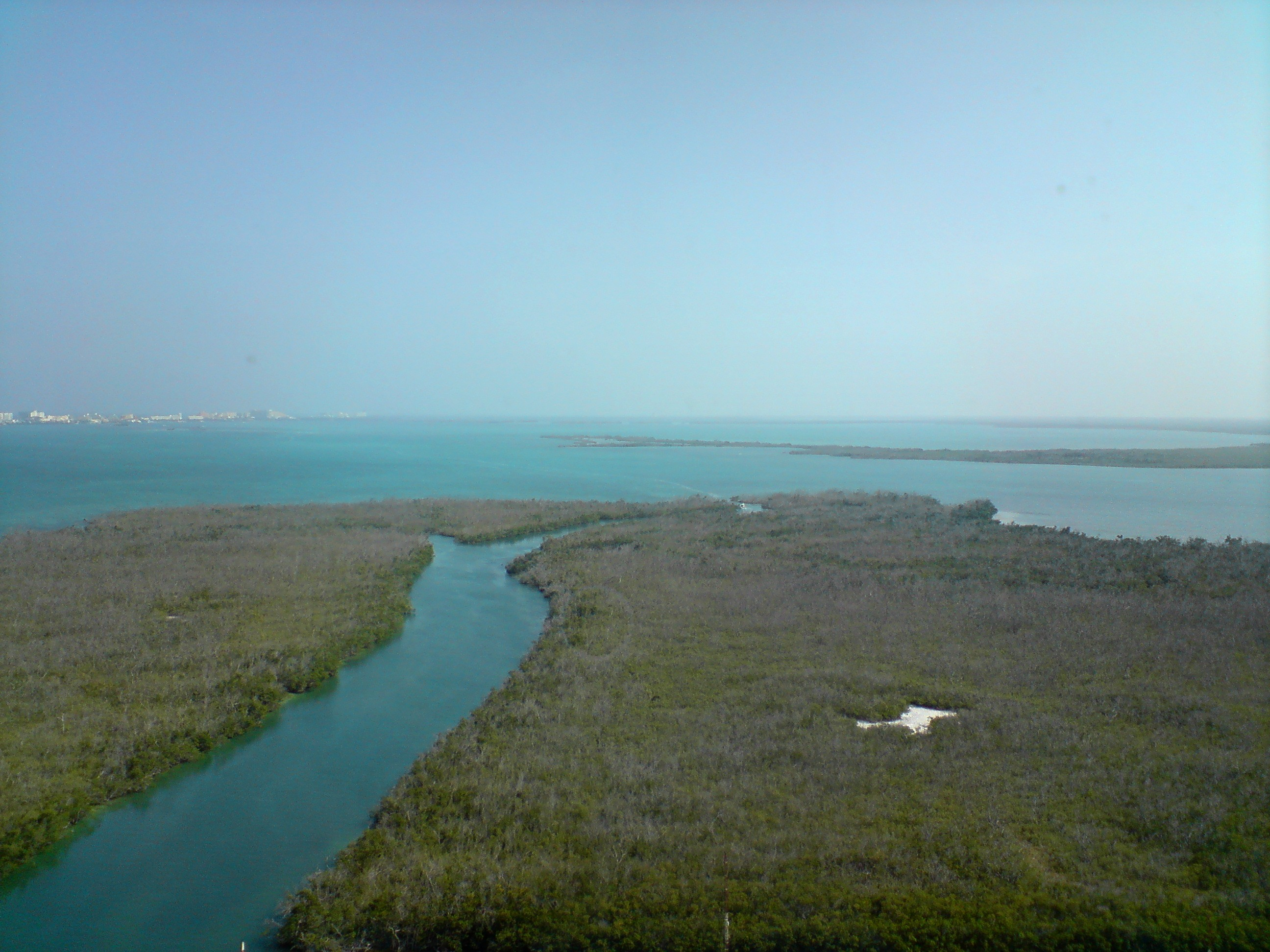
Aerial view of the Nichupte Lagoon

The principal businesses in this municipality are hotels, restaurants, travel agencies and tourist transportation.

Economic activities:

- Primary……………….3.7% (agriculture, hunting, fishing)
- Secondary…………….6.0% (manufacturing, construction, electricity)
- Tertiary……………….90.3% (trade, tourism)

== Local government ==
Mayors (Municipal Presidents):

- María Elena “Mara” Lezama Espinosa (MORENA) 2021-2024
- Clara Emilia Díaz Aguilar (MORENA) April-June 2021
- María Elena “Mara” Lezama Espinosa (MORENA) 2018-2021
- Remberto Estrada Barba (PVEM) 2016-2018
- Paul Michell Carrillo de Cáceres (PRI) 2013-2016
- Julián Javier Ricalde Magaña (PRD) 2011-2013
- Gregorio Sánchez Martínez (PRD) 2008-2010
