= Hotel Zone (Cancún) =

Tourist district of Cancún, Mexico

Hotel Zone Zona Hotelera
- City district
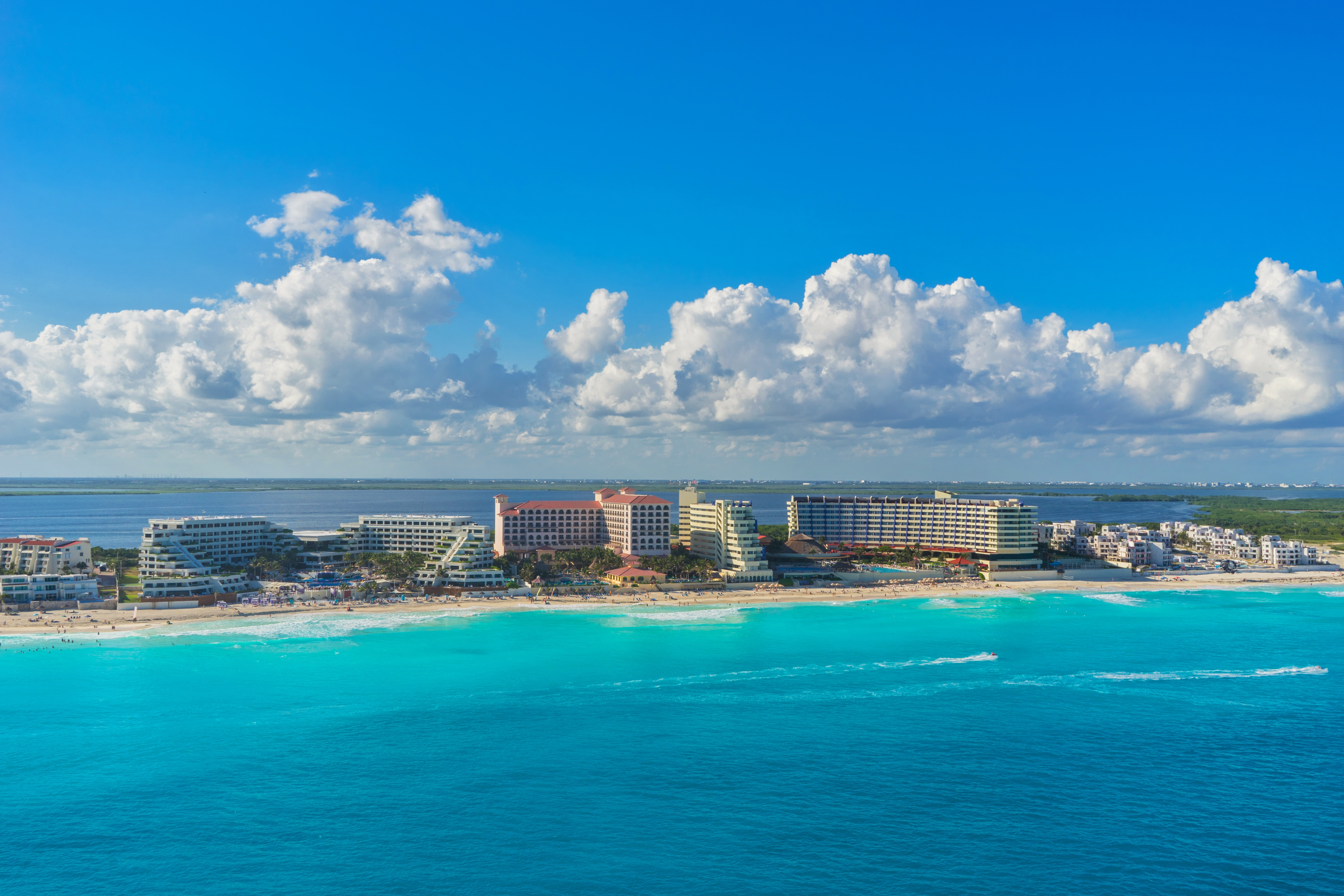
- Hotel Zone skyline
- Interactive map of Hotel Zone
- Coordinates: 21°08′04″N 86°44′46″W
- Country: Mexico
- State: Quintana Roo
- Municipality: Benito Juárez
- City: Cancún
- Broke ground: January 23, 1970
- District created: September 1974

Dimensions
  - Length: 22.5 km (14.0 mi)

The Hotel Zone (Spanish: Zona Hotelera) is a designated tourist district and strip of land on the coast of Cancún, Mexico. It consists of a variety of businesses, such as resorts, beaches, shops, nightclubs, and restaurants, aimed specifically at appealing to tourists. The strip itself is an island shaped like the number "7", running parallel to the mainland.

This stretch of land is the predominant reason for Cancún's fame as a resort hub and tourist destination, and a majority of Cancún's economic income comes from tourism to this area. It has gained notoriety for being a favored place among college students for spring break partying while having a lower crime rate than the rest of Cancún.

== History ==
=== Geographic formation ===
The island, known as Isla Cancún, is what the Hotel Zone is built on. It was formed over thousands of years through a process of ocean currents, known as longshore drift, carrying sand and sediment along the coast, parallel to the Yucatán Peninsula. The sediment collected in deposits and slowly formed a barrier island. Over time, a combination of weather and waves helped to reshape the island strip into its present-day "7" shape and separate it from the mainland, creating Nichupté Lagoon. The Mesoamerican Barrier Reef System serves as a natural protector against strong waves, given that the Hotel Zone is at the top of the peninsula. It lessens the impact of storm waves and helps prevent damage to coastal infrastructure.

=== Planning and creation ===
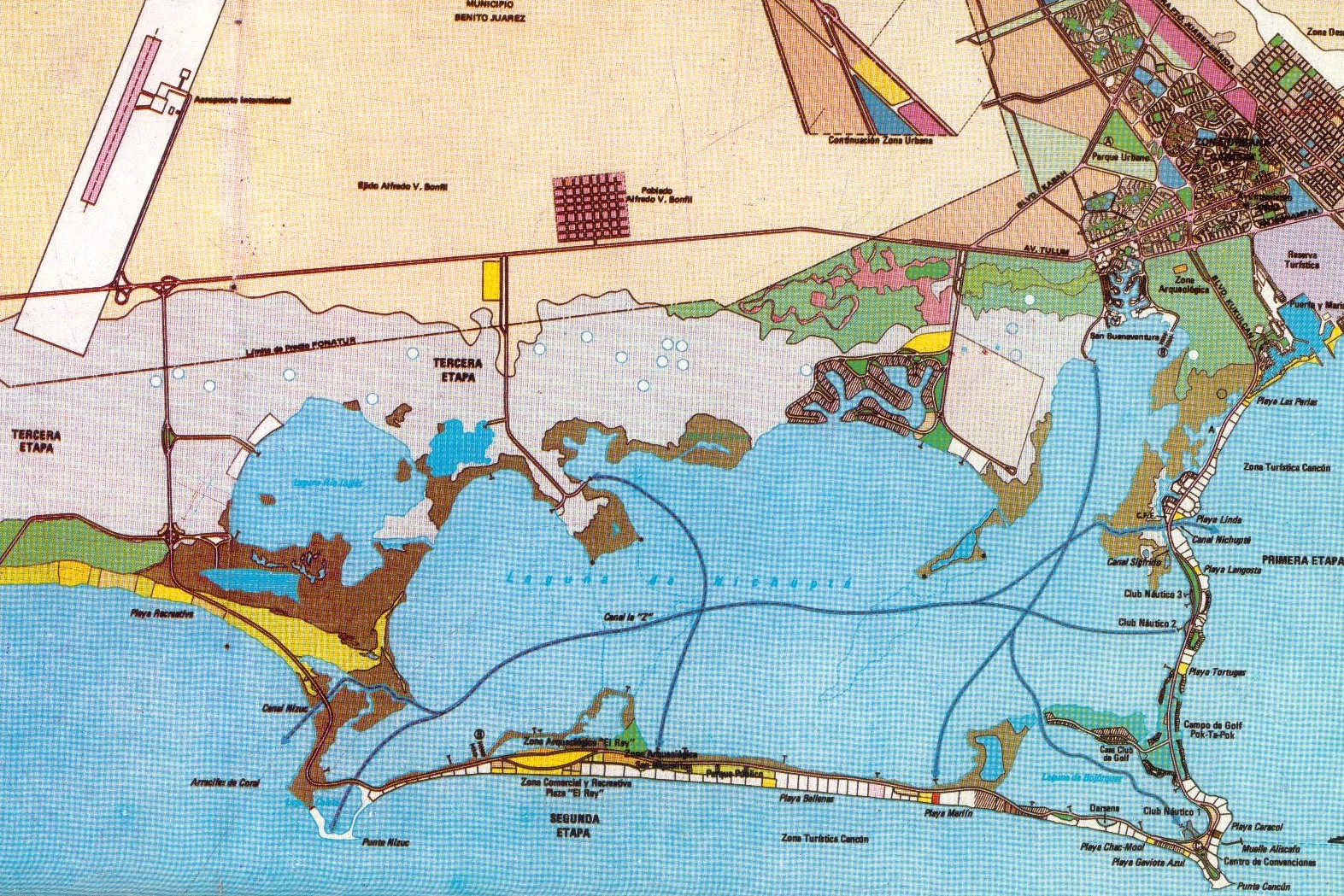
Original 1970 master plan of Cancún by Agustín Landa Verdugo

In 1967, the federal government allocated US$2 million to the Bank of Mexico for the construction of a recreation zone on land that had not been developed yet. Planning for the Hotel Zone began in 1970. A computer model nominated several locations based on their climate and capacity for tourism. After in-person visits to each site, officials chose a mangrove swamp located on an uninhabited barrier island off the coast of Cancún and Puerto Juárez, and construction began from scratch. The nearby town of Puerto Juárez was a small fishing village at the time. The project was masterplanned and overseen by Mexican architect Agustín Landa Verdugo. The first hotel designed particularly for tourists opened in Cancún in September 1974. The federal government financed the first nine hotels due to private investors not being convinced it would be profitable. By 1981, over $1.1 billion had been invested in the strip, with 48 hotels, a convention center, and a golf course. The original masterplan called for 2,000 hotel rooms to be built by 1974, considerably fewer than the 27,000 that existed in 2005. From its inception to 2024, the National Fund for Tourism Development, known locally as Fondo Nacional de Fomento al Turismo (Fonatur), controlled, maintained, and regulated the zone's infrastructure and tourism before handing the power over to the Quintana Roo state government. Fonatur was created to oversee the development of the tourist sectors of Mexico and financed the zone by constructing an airport and connecting the island to the mainland before selling the land to development corporations. At one point, the fund owned almost all public land in the city of Cancún and assumed responsibility for all maintenance.

=== Establishing reputation ===
It has since grown to be the most visited vacation and tourist district in Mexico and one of the most traveled to areas in the world, so much so that the Hotel Zone district is often confused with the city of Cancún as a whole and it has become common to use the two interchangeably. The project was originally conceived to only be one resort-centered area but evolved into many sectors that vary in cost and exclusivity. In 2025, 300 million pesos (US$16 million) were set aside to focus on maintenance in the area, including "beach care and infrastructure". The main focus is to renovate the preexisting infrastructure in an effort to modernize the district. In 2024, there were nearly 10 million tourists who visited the Hotel Zone.

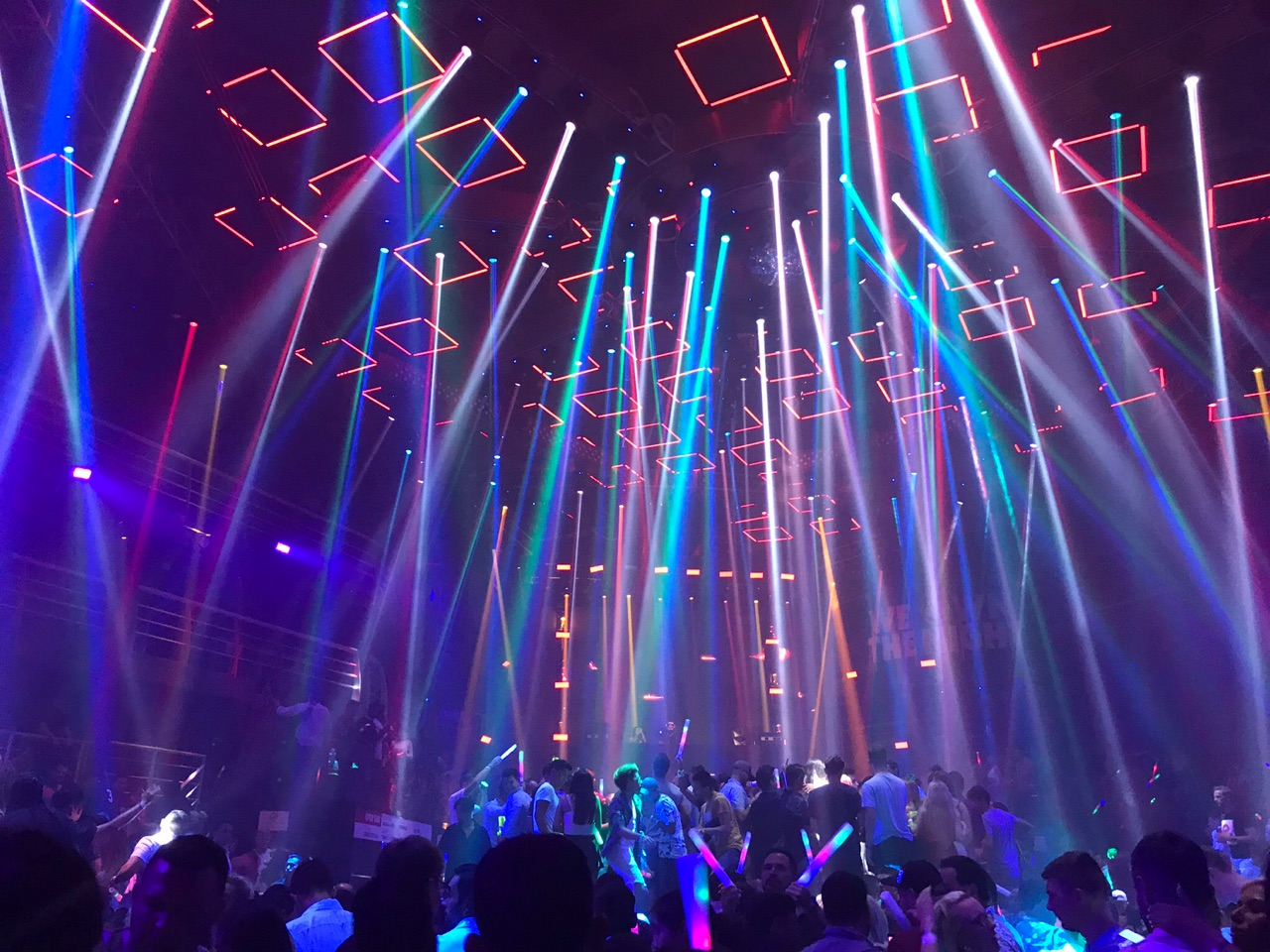
Nightclub located in the center of the Hotel Zone

Tourism reaches its peak during the spring break season. Most colleges across the United States give their students time off during mid-February, March, or early April. The Hotel Zone sees a massive boost in revenue and bookings throughout this time. Young adults who visit Cancún often party and drink alcohol. The nightlife scene is favored by college students, because the legal drinking age in Mexico is 18 years old, compared to 21 in the United States. The Hotel Zone has increasingly become a hotspot for hosting illegal activities, such as drug trafficking, binge drinking, and public intoxication. The spring break period and negative aspects of the Hotel Zone was documented in the 2003 film The Real Cancun.

=== Natural disasters and climate ===
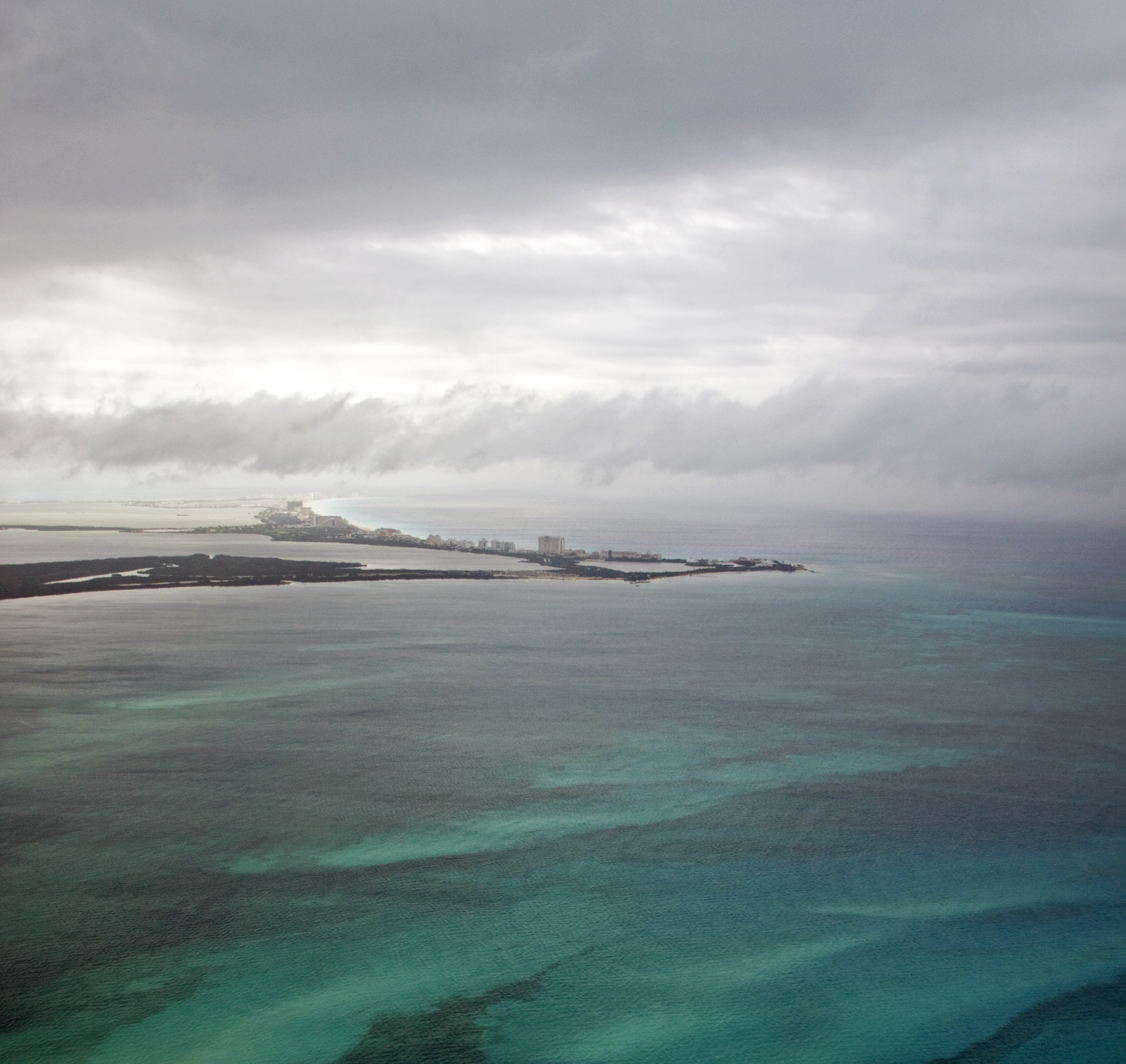
Severe thunderstorm coming to shoreline

As a result of the Hotel Zone being located on a thin strip of land that protrudes into the Caribbean Sea, it has been prone to hurricanes, most notably Gilbert (1988) and Wilma (2005). These kinds of natural disasters are uncommon but when they do occur, it can devastate the economy, which forces investors to quickly rebuild. As of 2026, there have been no major hurricanes since 2005. To prevent erosion from tropical storms and hurricanes, the beach's sand has been replenished numerous times with dredged sand.

Brown seaweed, known as Sargassum, has frequently appeared on Cancún's beaches due to its proximity to the Great Atlantic Sargassum Belt. As seaweed approaches the coast, some hotels have had to close their private beaches to allow authorities to restore it to its previously clean state, with others opting for temporary containment booms to prevent the seaweed from reaching land.

=== International affairs ===
It has been the setting of many major international diplomatic conferences including the North–South Summit (1981) and the World Trade Organization Ministerial Conference of 2003. Cancún is chosen due to a combination of factors, including its beaches, climate, infrequency of hurricanes, nearby labor, strong tourist-centered economy, and potential to expand. Most foreign leaders who visit Cancún stay in the Hotel Zone. In 2021, United States Senator Ted Cruz caused controversy for going on vacation to the Hotel Zone in the midst of major power outages across his home state of Texas.

== Crime ==
The Hotel Zone has lower occurrences of crime than the rest of the city as a result of increased police presence. Although Cancún was the 13th deadliest city in the world as of 2019, most crimes occur at night in the downtown district. Most public areas, such as beaches, are patrolled by National Guard soldiers during the height of the spring break tourist season. The major reason for the high crime and murder rate is cartel violence, particularly by the Gulf Cartel.

In 2009, Operation Quintana Roo began as an effort by the Mexican Army and Navy to root out cartels in the state of Quintana Roo but especially in Cancún. There have been multiple instances of cartel members dismembering tourists' bodies, college students being robbed at gunpoint, and shootouts between rival gangs on hotel property. In April 2018, 14 people were killed by cartel violence within a 36-hour span, the deadliest day in over a decade. Tourism has not dropped at a significant rate but foreign governments have issued warnings on traveling to the Hotel Zone. In August 2025, the United States Department of State issued a Level II travel warning for tourists to "exercise increased caution". Local officials claim the area is safe for tourists but hundreds of visitors have been killed in the last decade by cartel shootouts as they fight for control over the illegal drug market. On hotel property and private beaches there have been executions of gang leaders by rival cartels and shootouts between federal agents against drug traffickers in undercover sting operations. Skeletal remains have frequently been found on the shore in some of the busiest parts of the Hotel Zone. Some private taxi services have been under scrutiny for reports of abduction, assault, and robbing customers of valuables, with hotels warning its guests to avoid using them.

== Economic impact ==
=== Background ===
The Hotel Zone has become synonymous with the "tourist part" of Cancún, and contains many well known beaches, such as Playa Tortugas and Playa Delfines. It is essentially a "tourist bubble", isolated from the rest of the city and made to predominantly appeal to international visitors. This area has boosted the economy of Cancún and created many job opportunities for natives of the city. It is estimated that 90% of Quintana Roo's state GDP comes from tourism. In 1974, there were 2,000 hotel rooms, compared to 2005 with 27,000. During the COVID-19 pandemic, tourism drastically decreased and greatly hurt the local economy. There has also been a sharp decline in international tourists since 2024, with a 14% drop between July and August compared to the previous year. In 2025, spring break hit a record high, reversing the effects of the previous years. The region around Cancún has become one of the foremost international travel destinations in Latin America. There are plans to build additional hotel zones nearby in the future.

=== Tourism statistics ===
The chart below is based on data compiled from the years 2016 to 2024, showing the annual number of tourists visiting Cancún. According to the data, the average amount of arrivals per year is 7.7 million people.

== Layout ==
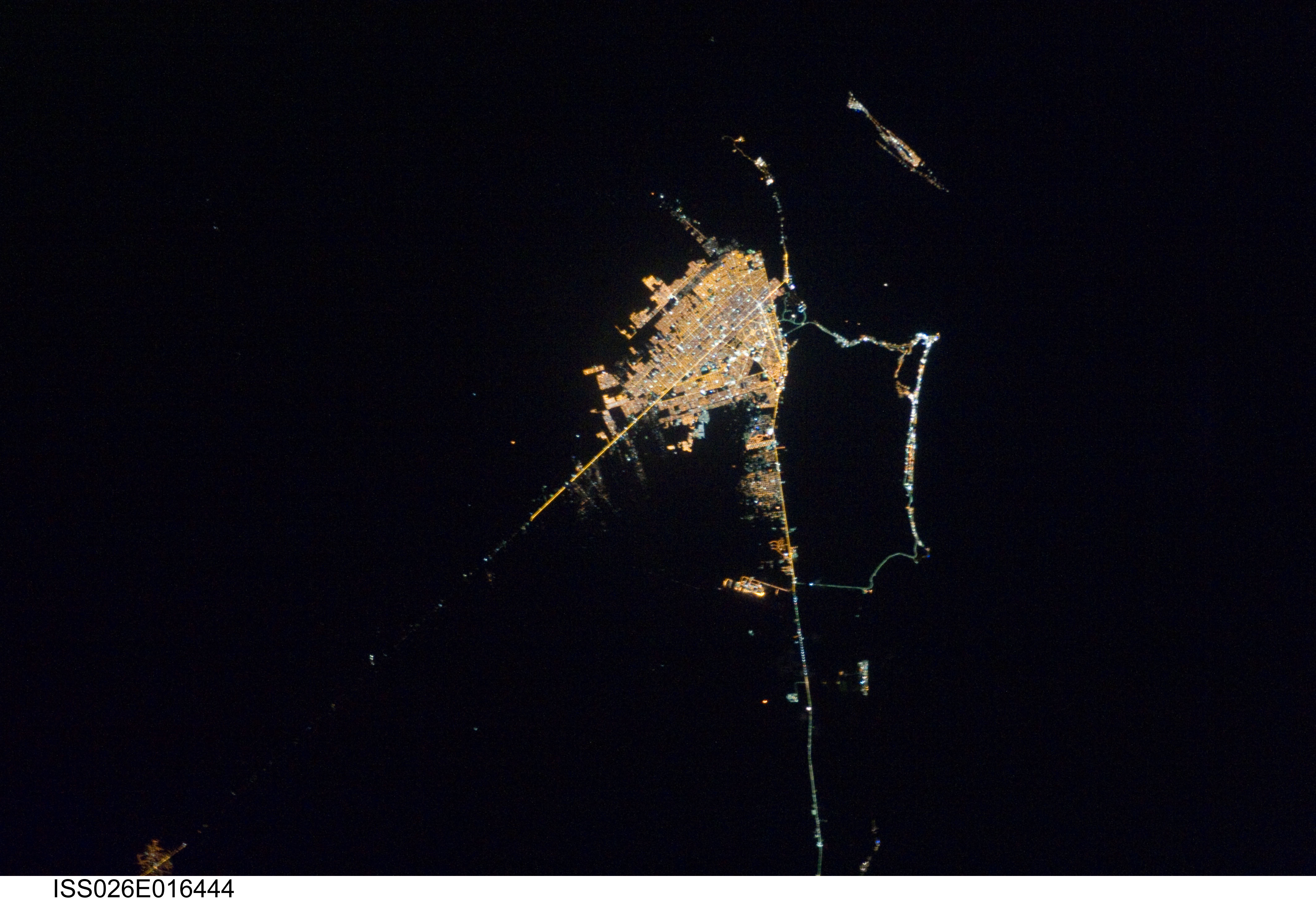
View of Cancún from the International Space Station at night, with the Hotel Zone (the strip of land on the center right) clearly visible

There are over 190 hotels in the Hotel Zone and over 35,000 hotel rooms in total. The entire area is connected by Kukulcan Boulevard (Spanish: Boulevard Kukulcán) and is the primary road in Cancún, running from downtown (El Centro) to the airport. To minimize traffic, Nichupté Vehicular Bridge also runs from downtown to the Hotel Zone, crossing over Nichupté Lagoon and reducing driving time by 45 minutes. There are public buses that specifically serve the Hotel Zone and drop tourists off at stops along the boulevard.

The district as a whole is built on a natural barrier island formed by the Mesoamerican Barrier Reef System that connects to the mainland Yucatán Peninsula, is just over 22 kilometers (14 miles) long, and is bounded by Nichupté Lagoon to the west, as well as the Caribbean Sea to the east. It is one of two major zones of Cancún, the other being the El Centro (the downtown) area on the mainland which is not tourist-centered, is more traditional, has a higher crime and poverty rate, and is less economically prosperous compared to the more wealthy resort areas in the Hotel Zone.

=== Tourist attractions ===
Since the area is heavily reliant on tourism, local developers have been tasked with creating points of interest that will draw foreigners to the region. Some tourist attractions and resorts include the Punta Cancun Lighthouse, the El Rey archaeological site, the Melody Maker hotel, the Golden Parnassus Resort, and the Mayan Museum of Cancún. The Hotel Zone has similarities to the nearby Riviera Maya, which is also a resort district to the south and includes Playa del Carmen and Tulum, whereas the Hotel Zone only includes Cancún.

== Gallery ==
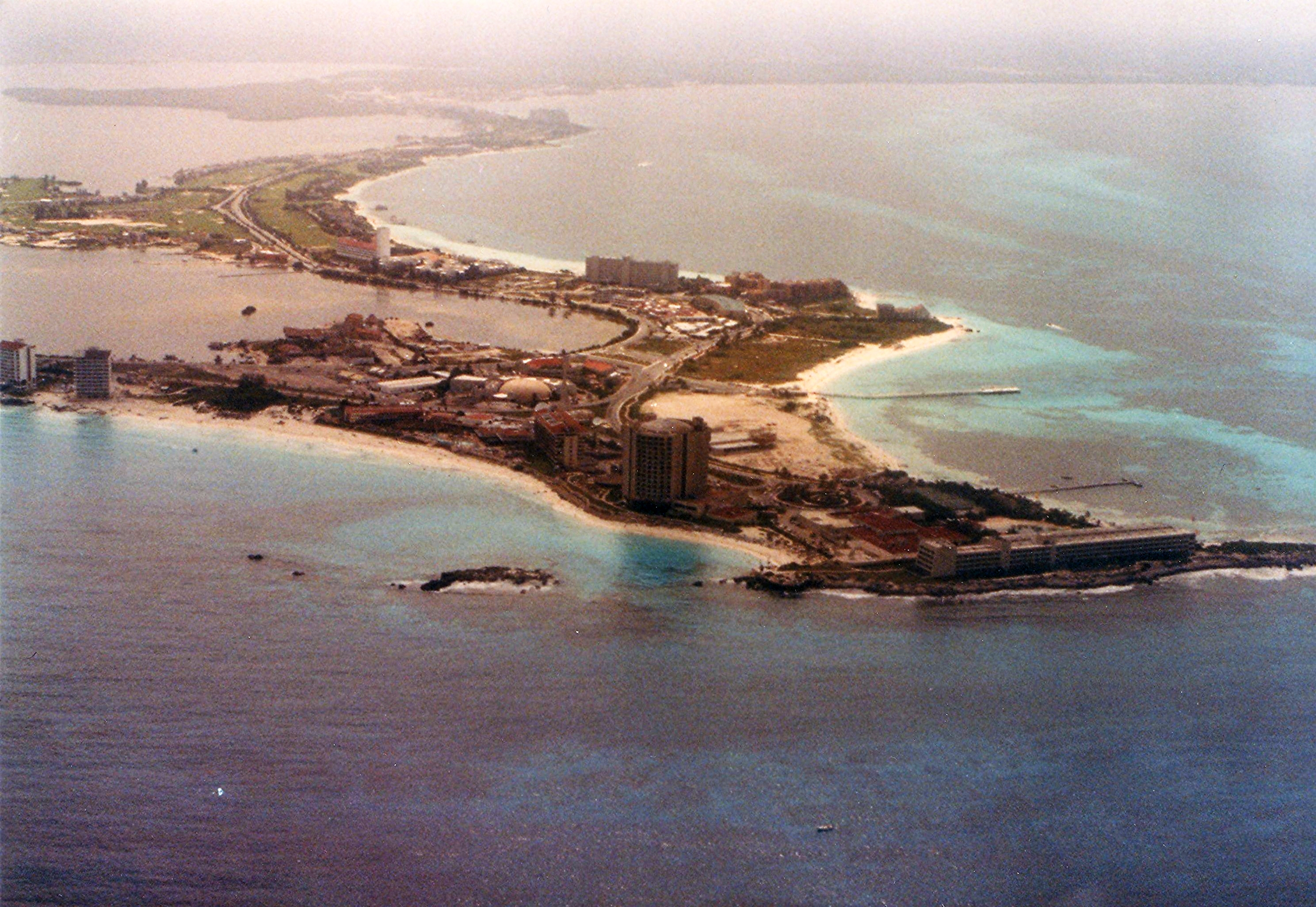
Hotel Zone in 1985

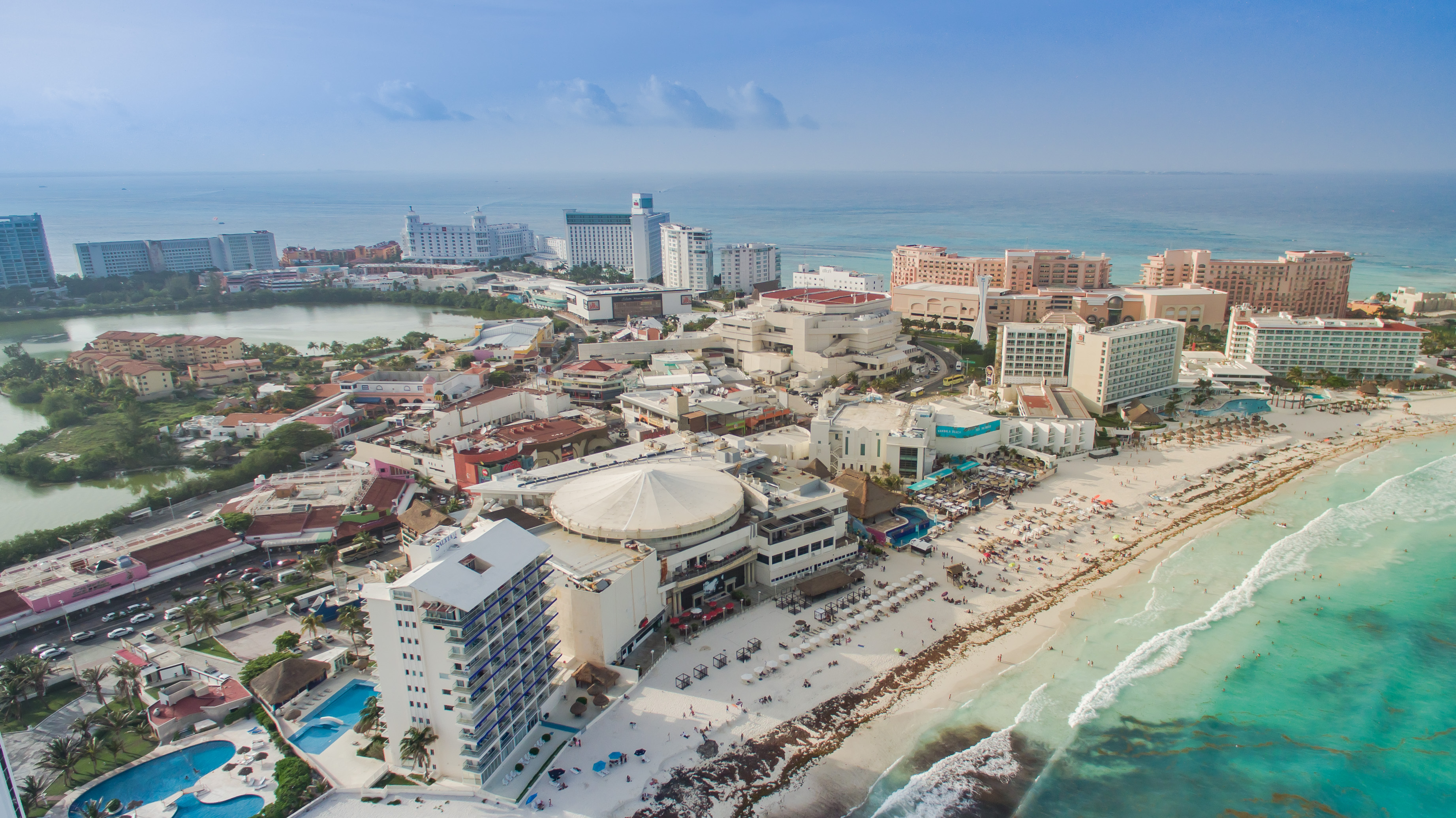
Hotel Zone grouping of resorts

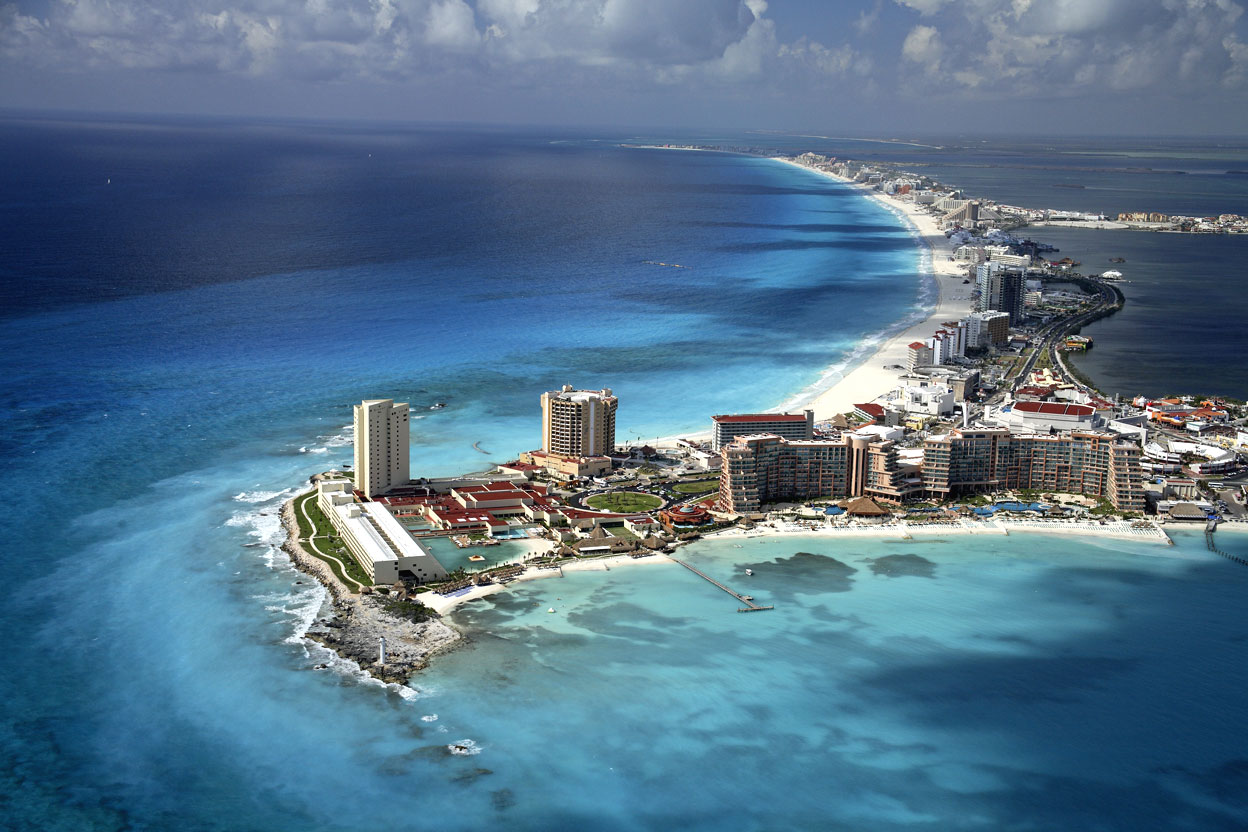
Aerial view of resorts

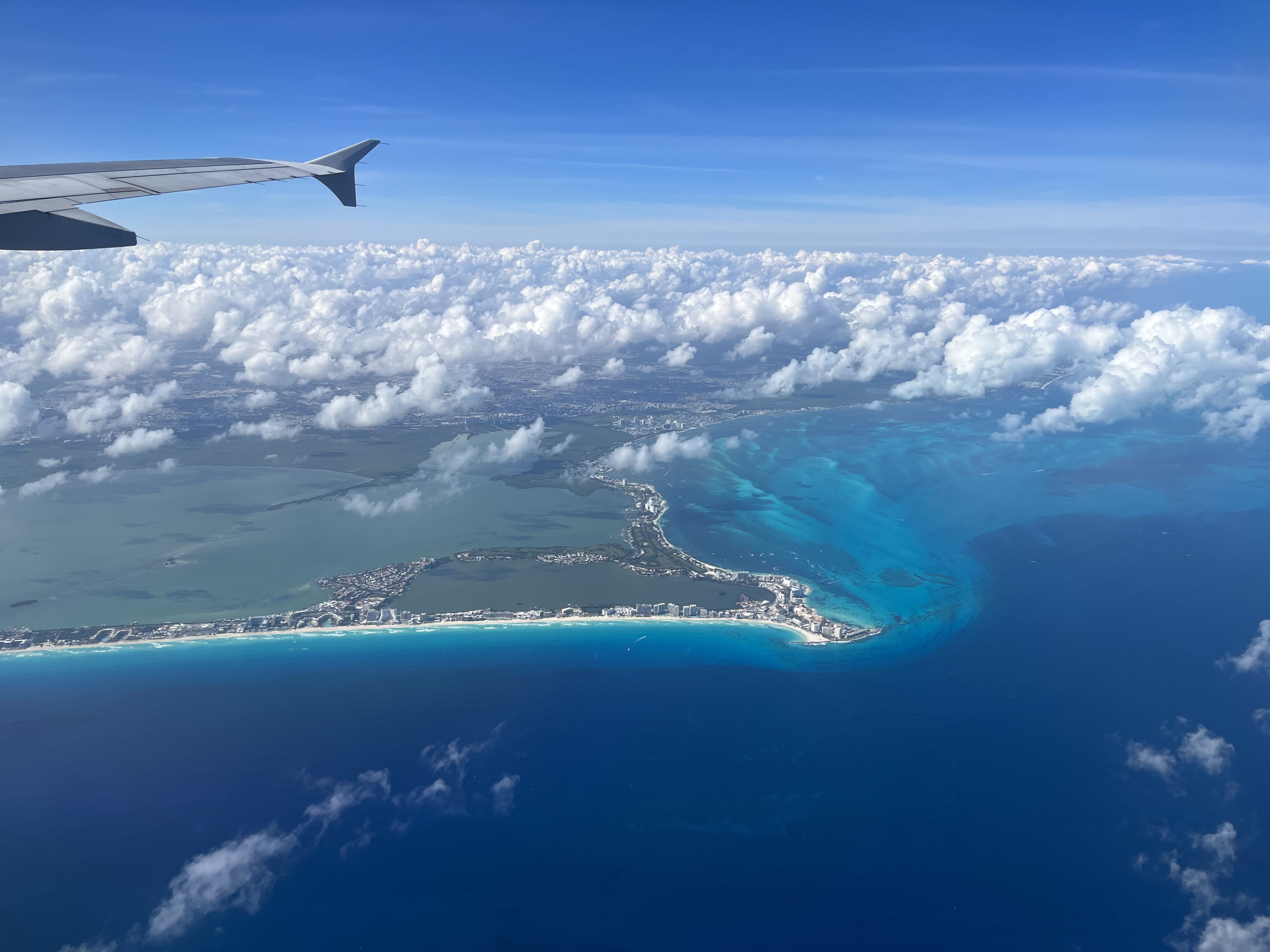
Wider aerial view in 2024

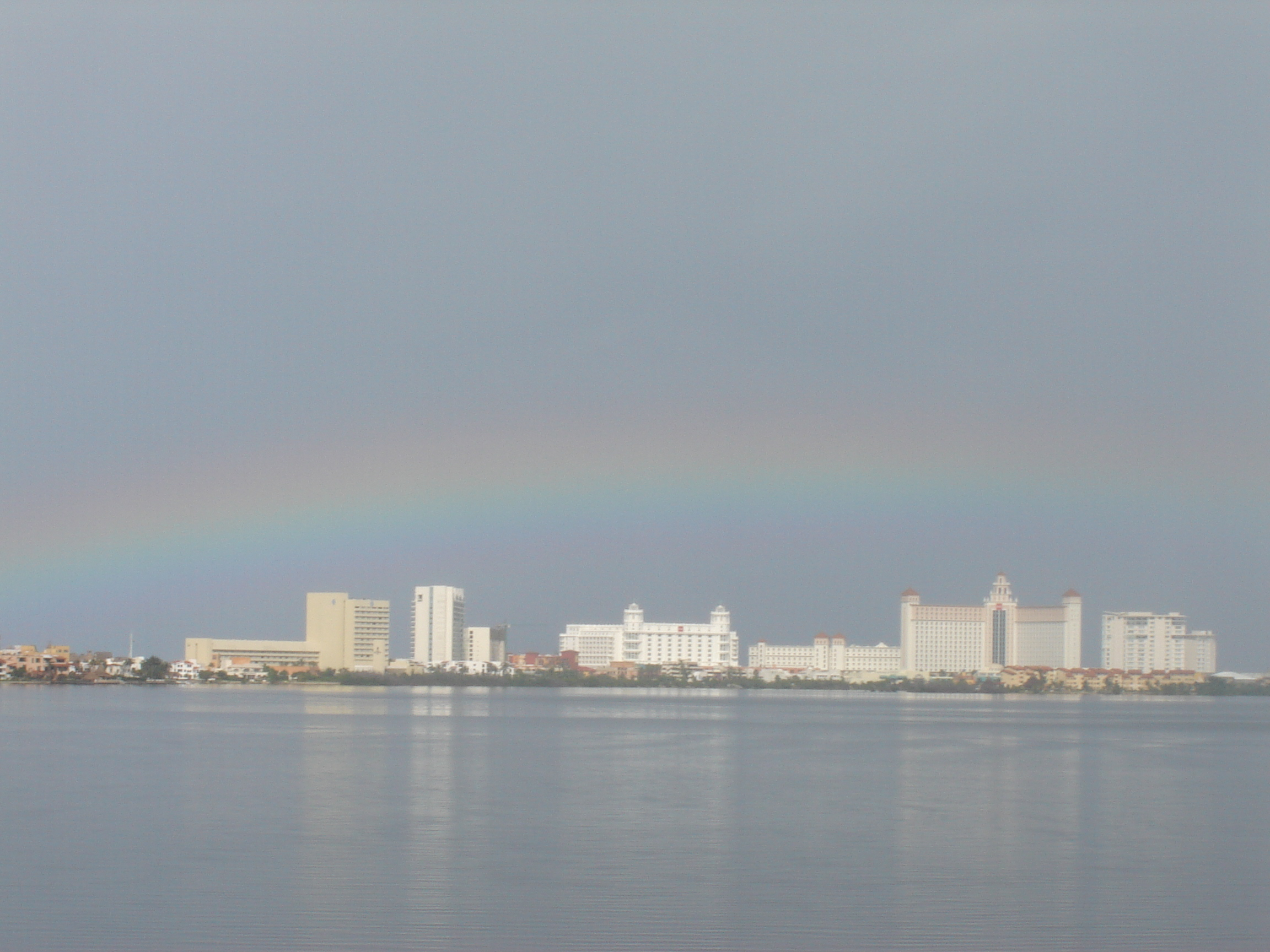
Skyline during storm

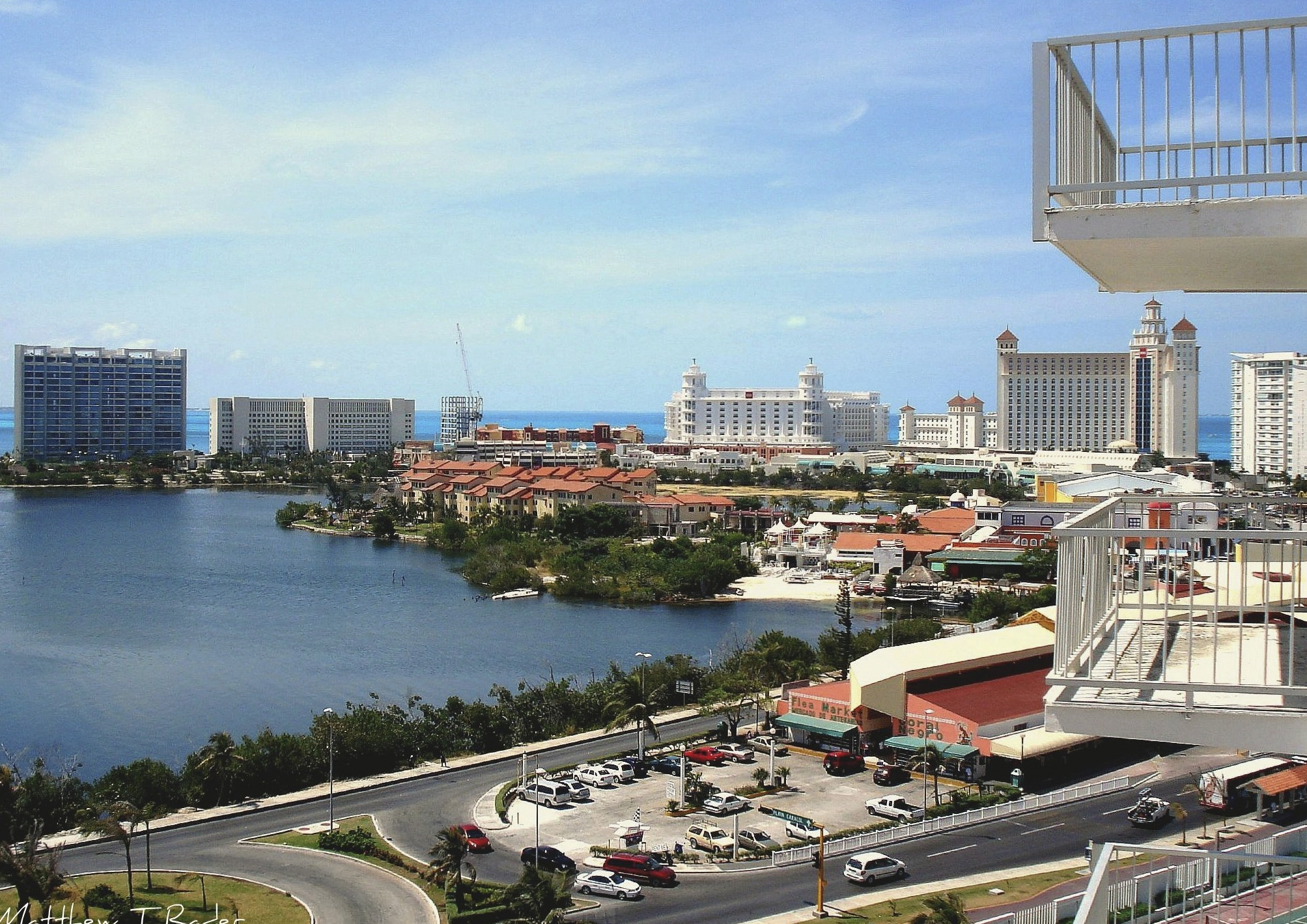
Balcony view

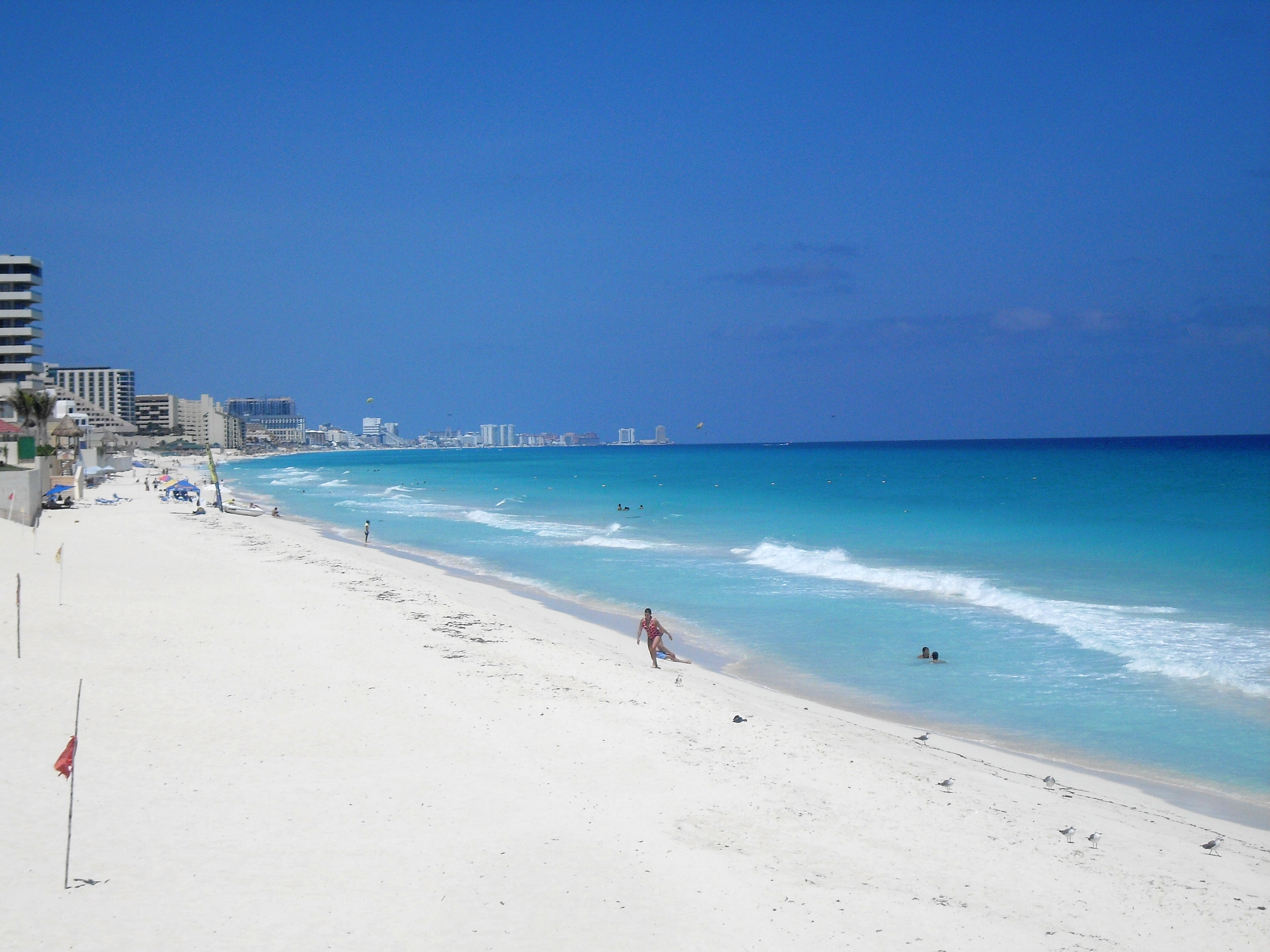
Playa Delfines

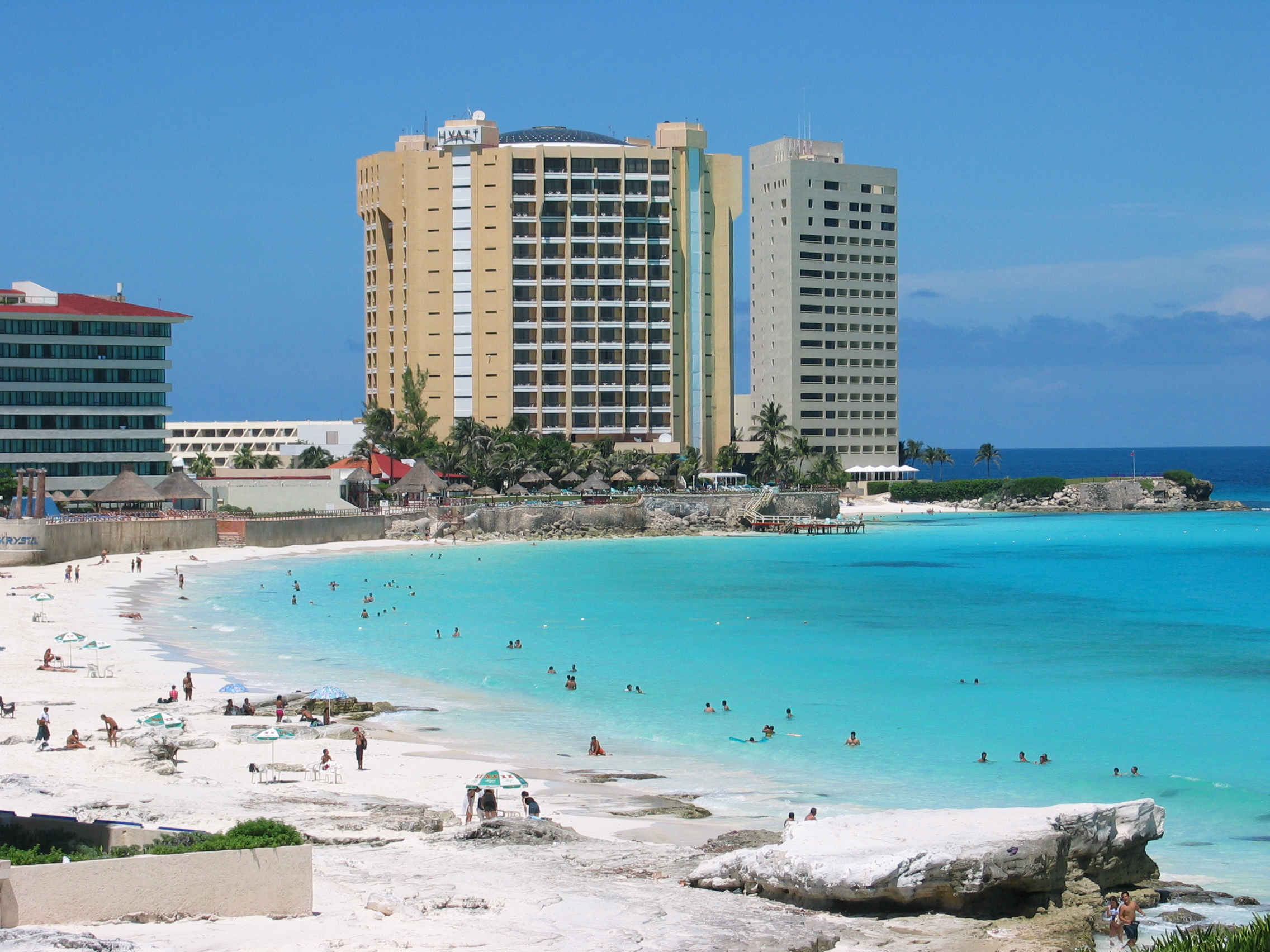
Beach with resort in the background

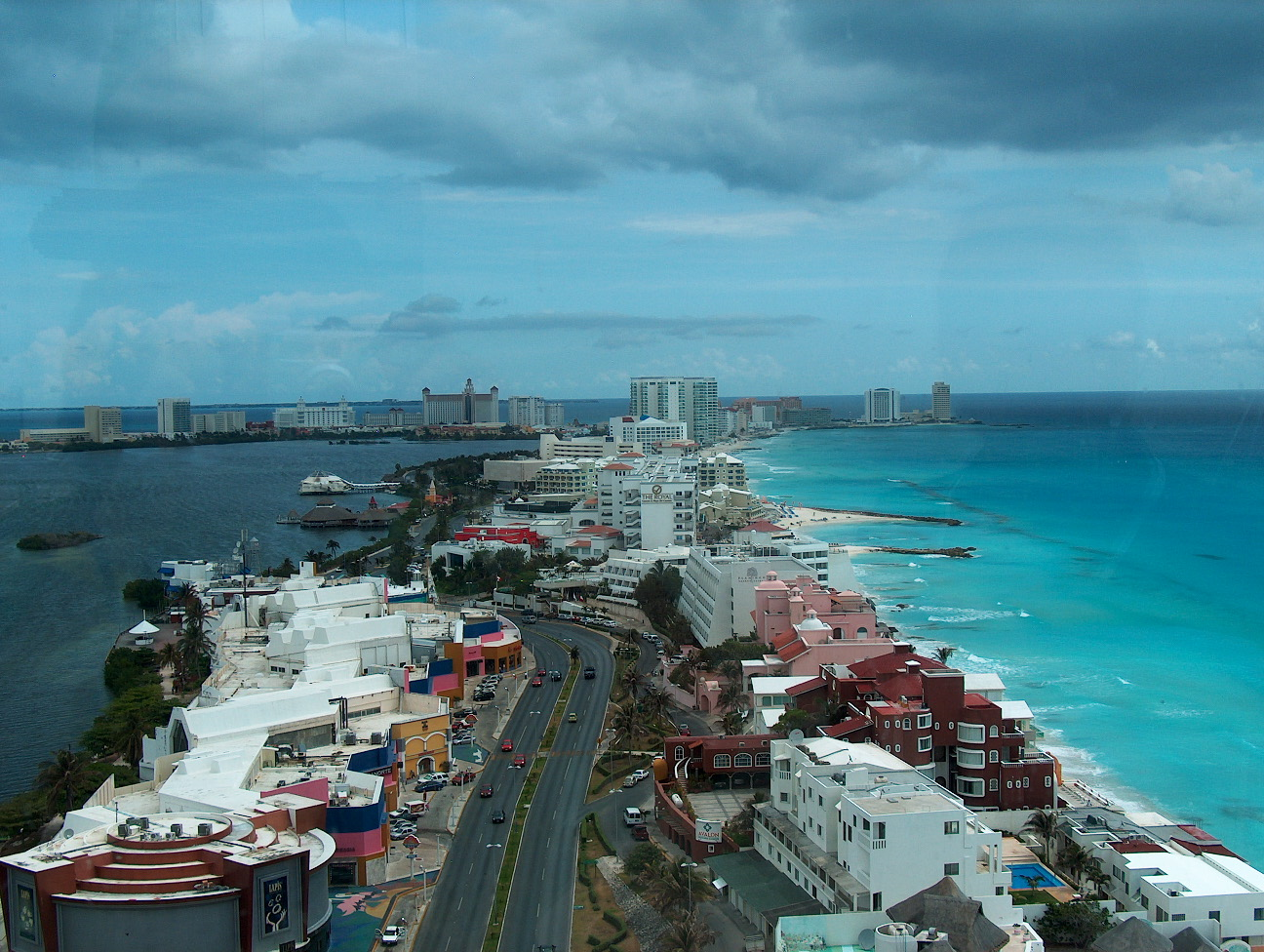
Kukulcan Boulevard

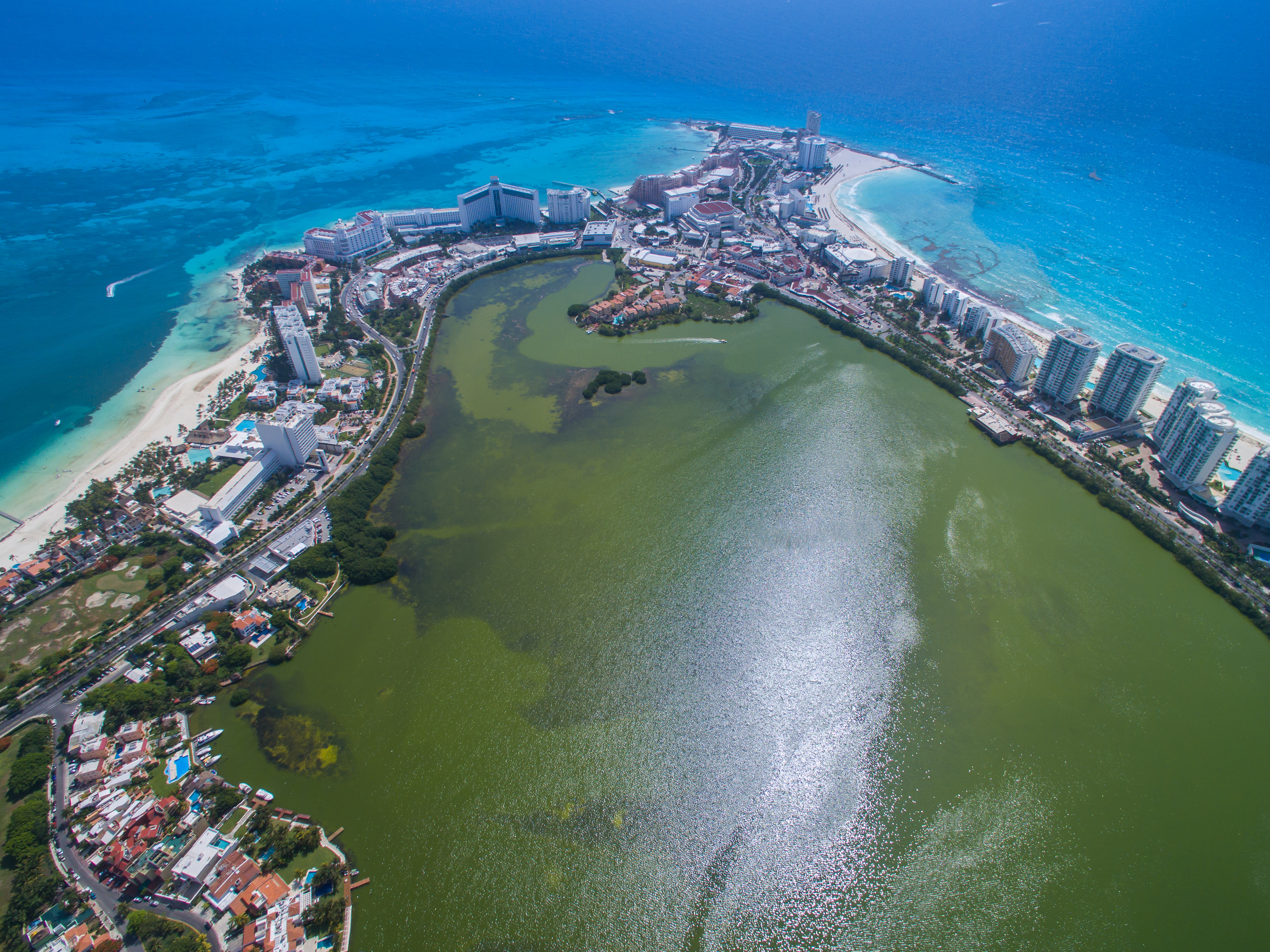
Caribbean Sea (top) and Nichupté Lagoon, bisected by the Hotel Zone

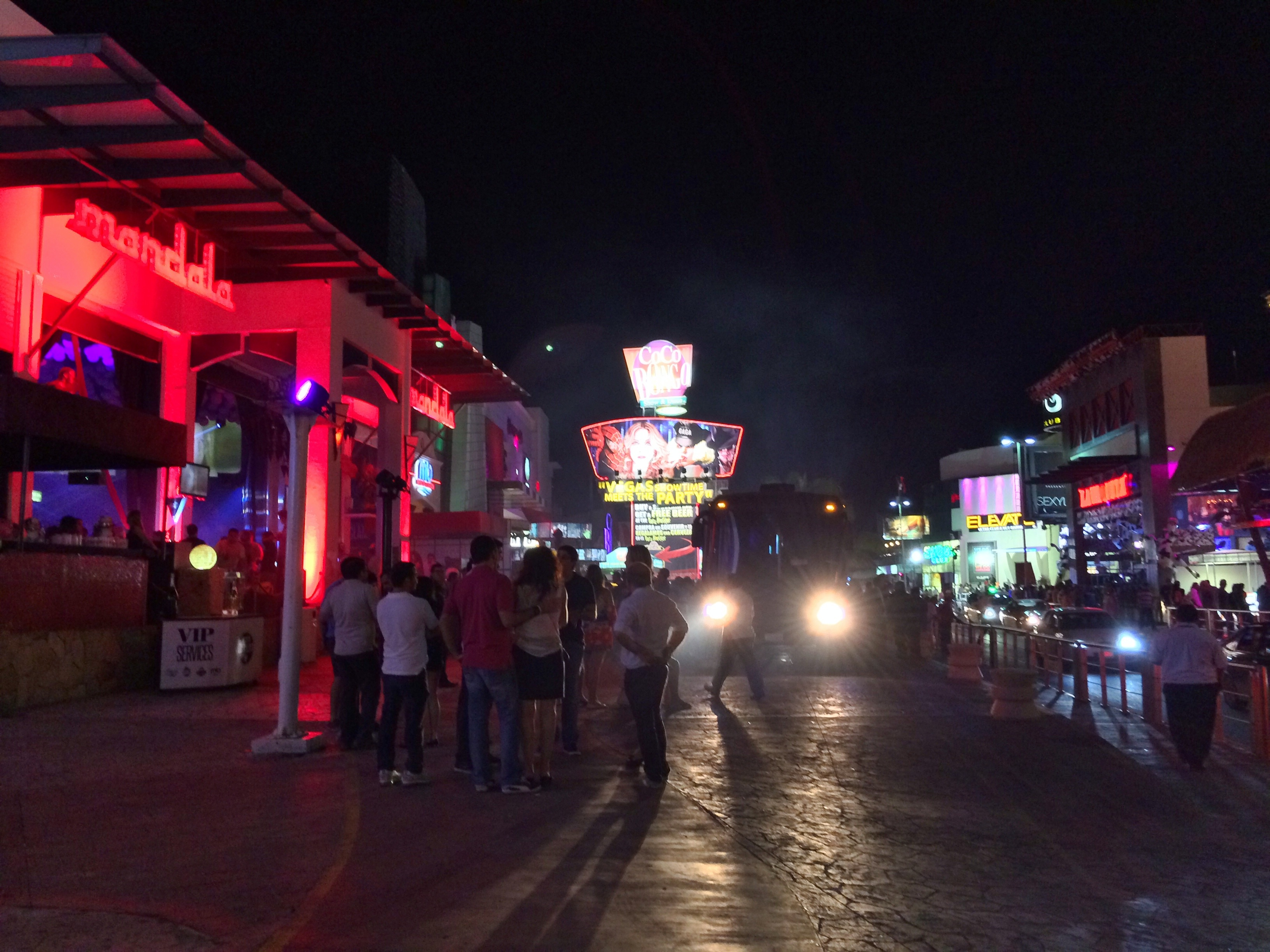
Hotel Zone's nightlife scene

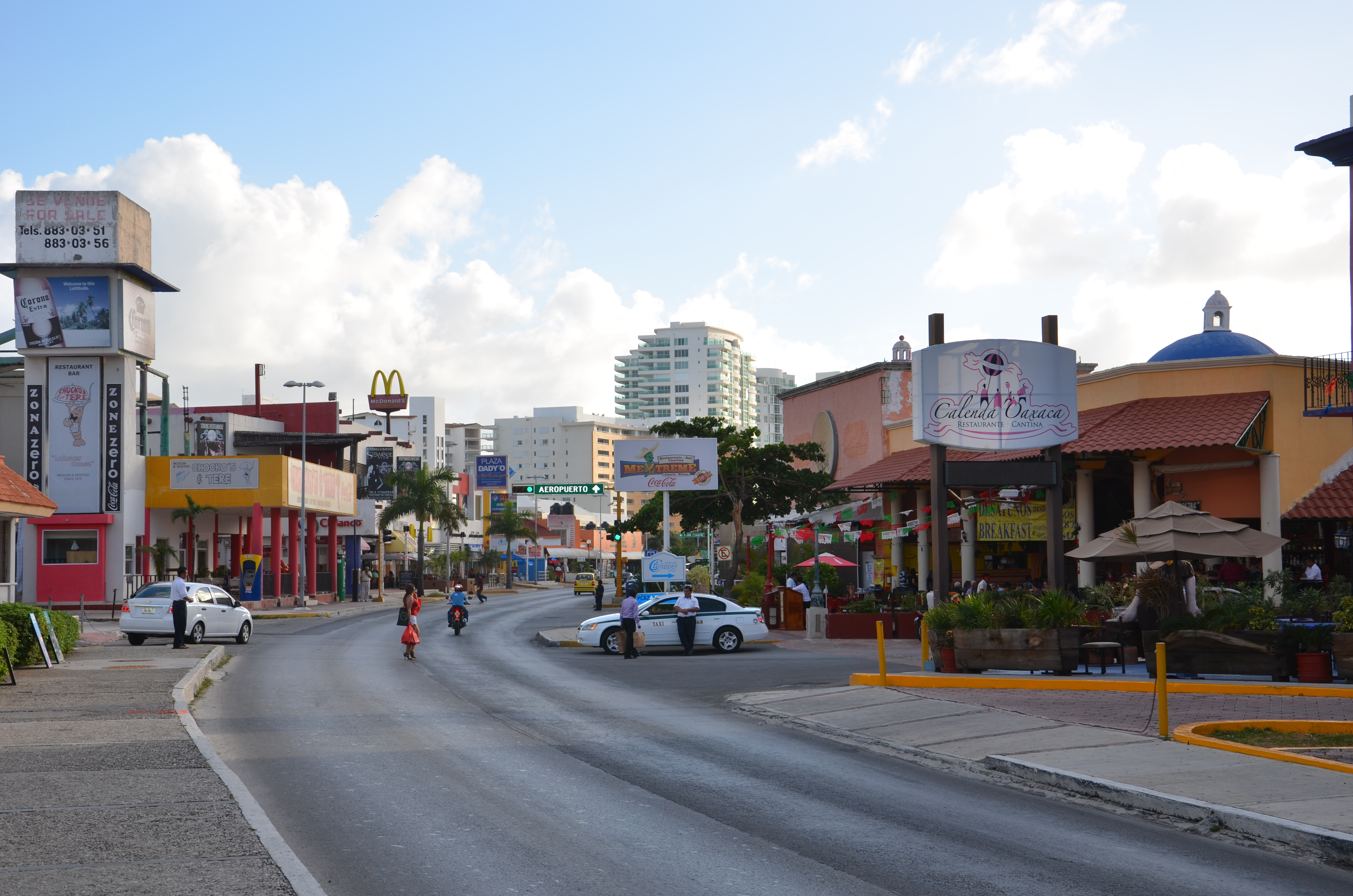
Restaurant area

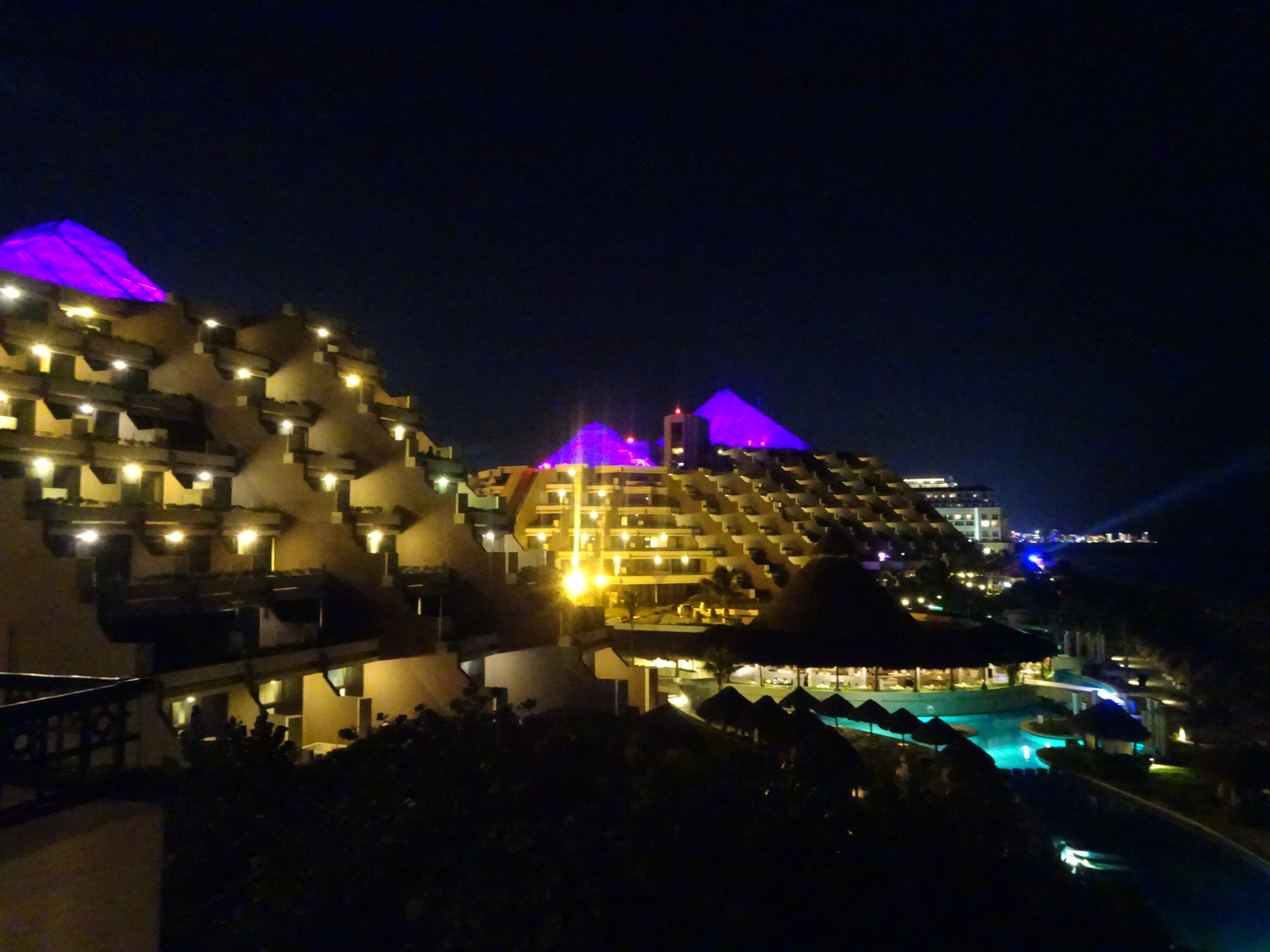
Hotel Zone at night

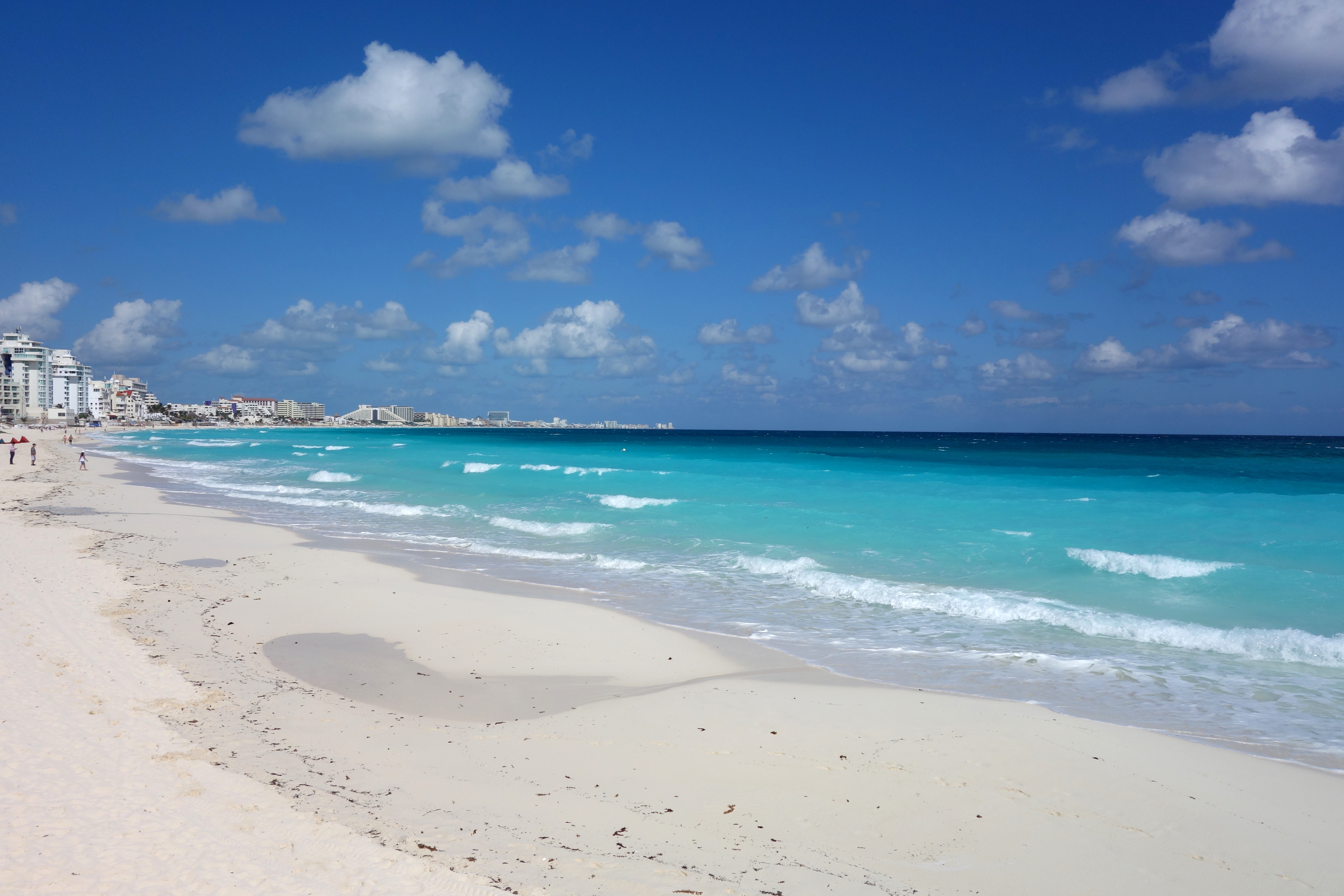
Beach in 2016

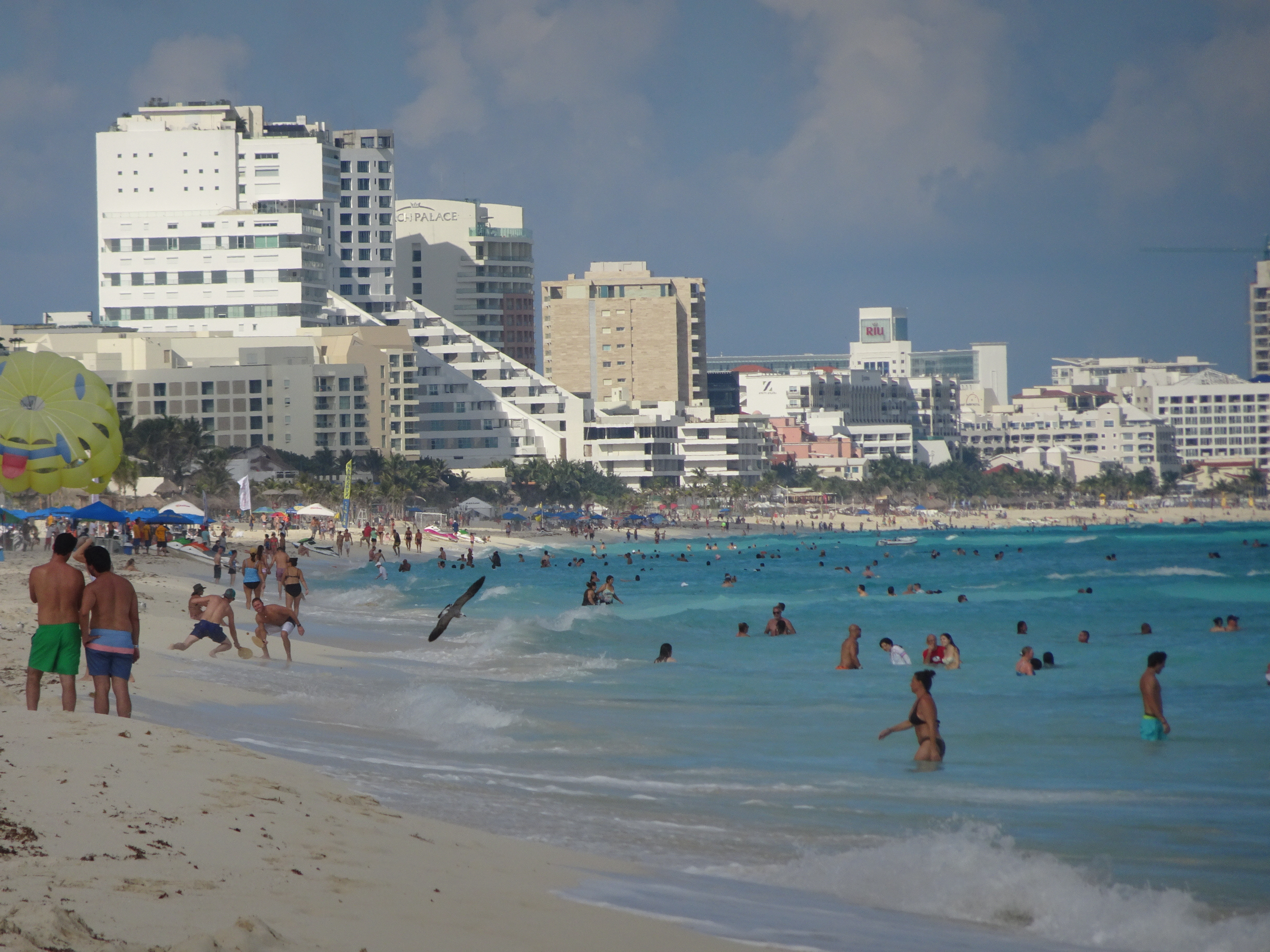
Tourists on vacation

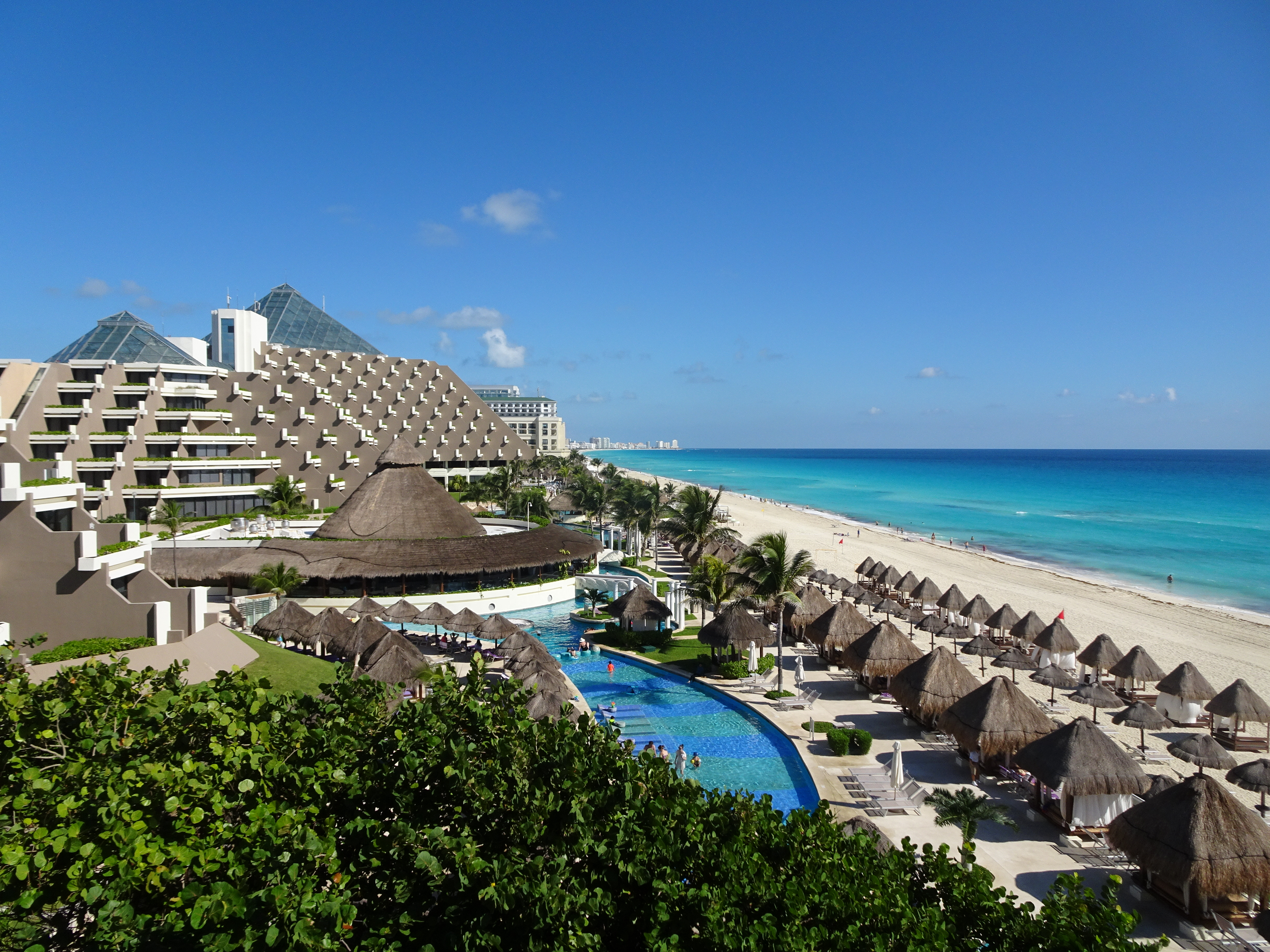
Resort on the waterfront

== See also ==
- Riviera Maya, similar tourist district to the south
- Isla Mujeres, island across from Cancún that was also developed for tourism
- Puerto Juárez, district of Cancún and original city settlement before Cancún was founded
- Puerto Cancún, planned community and district of Cancún at the north end of the Hotel Zone
- Seaside resort, a town on the coast where tourism runs its economy
- Balneario, a resort town with Spanish influence and is most popular during the summer
