= Agustín Landa Verdugo =

Mexican architect (1923–2009)

- Born: 1923; Mexico City, Mexico
- Died: 3 October 2009 (aged 85–86); Mexico
- Occupations: Architect, urban planner

Agustín Landa Verdugo (1923 – 3 October 2009) was a Mexican architect and urban planner, born in Mexico City. He studied architecture in the National University of Mexico (now UNAM). In 1945 he established a firm with his brother Enrique, with whom he designed hundreds of public and private buildings during four decades of partnership. The firm's work distinguished itself by its modern language and the efficiency and economy of the solutions it proposed.

The work of Landa Verdugo's firm was influential in many areas of architecture in Mexico, including the design of hospitals and social housing, where its pioneering designs became standards for younger architects.

As an urban planner, Agustin Landa Verdugo was the author of the master plan of a number of new cities and neighborhoods in Mexico, most notably the city of Cancún and the Hotel Zone, which was built in the early 1970s on an uninhabited island in the state of Quintana Roo.

== Hospitals ==
Some of the earliest major projects by Landa Verdugo were public hospitals for the Mexican Social Security Institute (IMSS) in cities such as Delicias, Chih., and Puebla, Pue., built between 1952 and 1956. The experience gained in these projects would prove valuable when, in 1959, the government requested from his firm the design of a network of fifty-five health facilities in Mexico City.

The Institute for Social Security and Services for State Workers (ISSSTE) assumed the responsibility to provide health services for its members in 1958. For this purpose, it needed hospitals and clinics that would satisfy the large demand. Landa Verdugo thus conceived a large, central hospital with 600 beds, named Hospital 20 de Noviembre, as well as six smaller hospitals and forty-eight clinics, built after two standard models. The hospitals and clinics included, in addition to their medical functions, pharmacies and day-care centers.

According to architecture critic Miquel Adria, the Hospital 20 de Noviembre is one of the "25 most significant buildings from the 20th century in Mexico".

== Housing Units ==
Soon after his work for the ISSSTE, Landa Verdugo began working on ambitious public housing complexes. The first of such complex was Loma Hermosa, in Mexico City, with 1,648 apartments for bureaucrats. The project, funded by the Inter-American Development Bank and inaugurated in 1964, consists of 76 four-story slabs in a large plot of land surrounded by wide avenues and with no internal circulations for cars. Instead, circulations are pedestrian, and large areas are destined for gardens, schools and commercial spaces.

The buildings in Loma Hermosa are made of traditional masonry and concrete columns integrated into the walls. This proved to be an efficient layout and structure, and it was repeated by the state's housing agencies in many of the social housing complexes built in Mexico City and other parts of the country during the 1960s.

The Lomas de Sotelo Housing Complex

Between 1965 and 1967, Landa Verdugo designed a new housing unit known as Lomas de Sotelo, with 2,090 apartments. He used a similar layout and structure as that of Loma Hermosa, and again included a school and a commercial area in the complex. Other complexes from this time include the Cuitlahuac, Xotepingo and Vicente Guerrero housing blocks, all of them in Mexico City.

In the later part of his career, Agustín Landa Verdugo began experimenting with different spatial organizations in his housing units. Two projects from the seventies, commissioned by INFONAVIT, are the Ejército Nacional and Pedregal de Carrasco housing units. These projects consist of modules of six by six meters that are organized in patterns that respond to the topography and shape of lots where they were built.

The Ejército Nacional unit, finished in 1974, is of special interest because it was built on an unused plot of land inside a city block. It is one of the first infills in the history of Mexican architecture. This project was part of a strategy by INFONAVIT, the country's main public housing agency, called "Aprovechamiento de terrenos baldíos urbanizados" (Taking advantage of abandoned urban plots).

== Urban Planning ==
The first major urban planning project by Landa Verdugo was the master plan of Ciudad Sahagún, in the state of Hidalgo. In the early fifties, as the country's economy was rapidly industrialized, new spaces for large factories were required, outside the saturated major cities of the country. President Miguel Alemán thus commissioned Landa Verdugo's firm to conceive a new city, in an agricultural valley to the north-east of Mexico City. The commission included the design of the urban layout as well as housing, commercial spaces and the facilities for two of the factories that would operate in the new city.

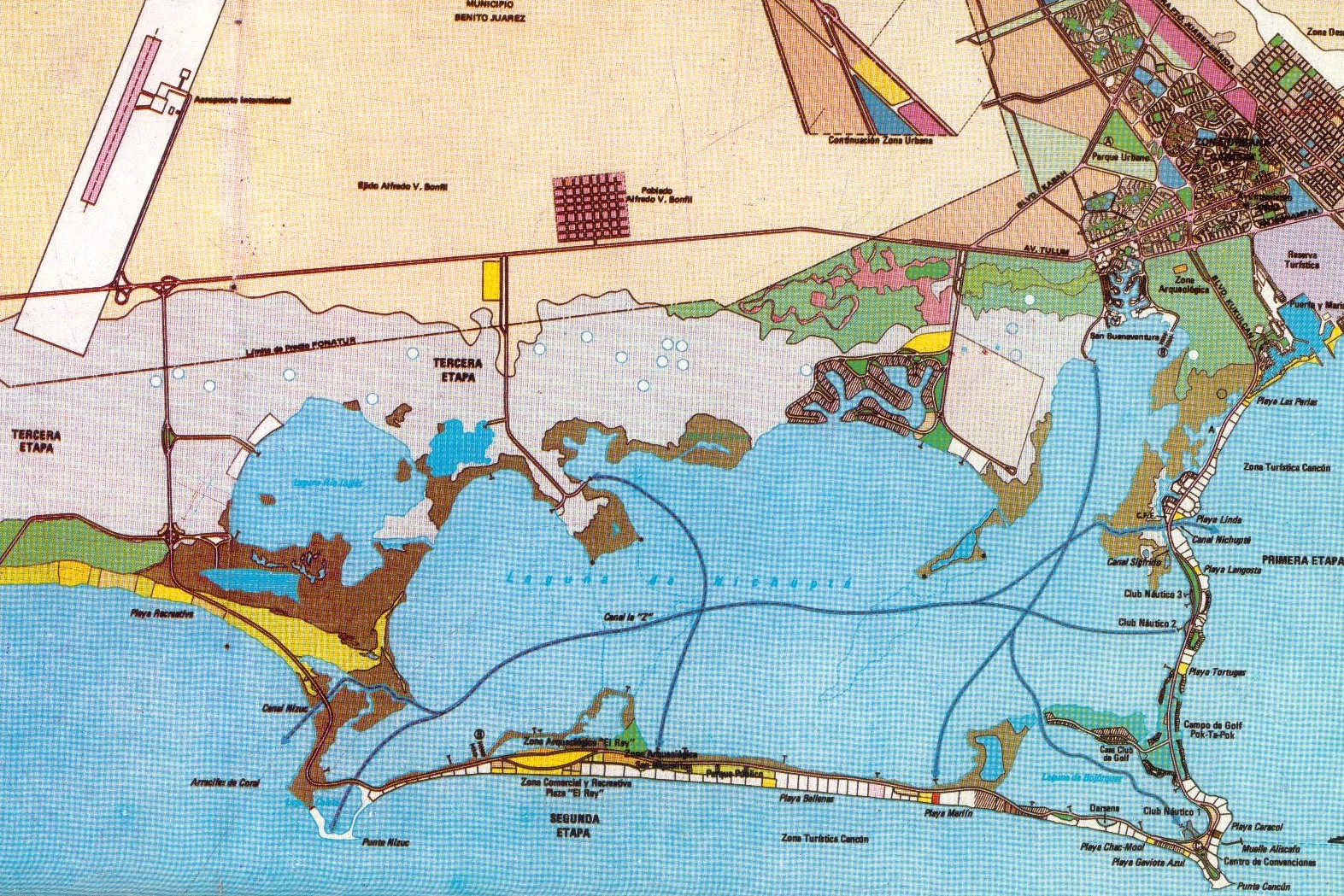
Master Plan of the city of Cancun

In the late 1960s, Landa Verdugo's firm undertook other ambitious urban design projects. Hired by the Bank of Mexico, the architect was a member of the committee that selected the sites for new tourist centers in the Mexican coast. The sites that were chosen were Cancún, Ixtapa, in the coast of the state of Guerrero, Huatulco, in Oaxaca, and Los Cabos and Loreto in the state of Baja California Sur.

Agustin Landa Verdugo's firm then began drawing the plans of the new tourist centers. In the case of Cancún, since there was no town in the site selected, the city was built from scratch. Ixtapa, on the other hand, was built next to the preexisting town of Zihuatanejo. Both projects contemplated areas for hotels, a convention center, luxury housing, golf courses as well as housing and services for the city's permanent population.

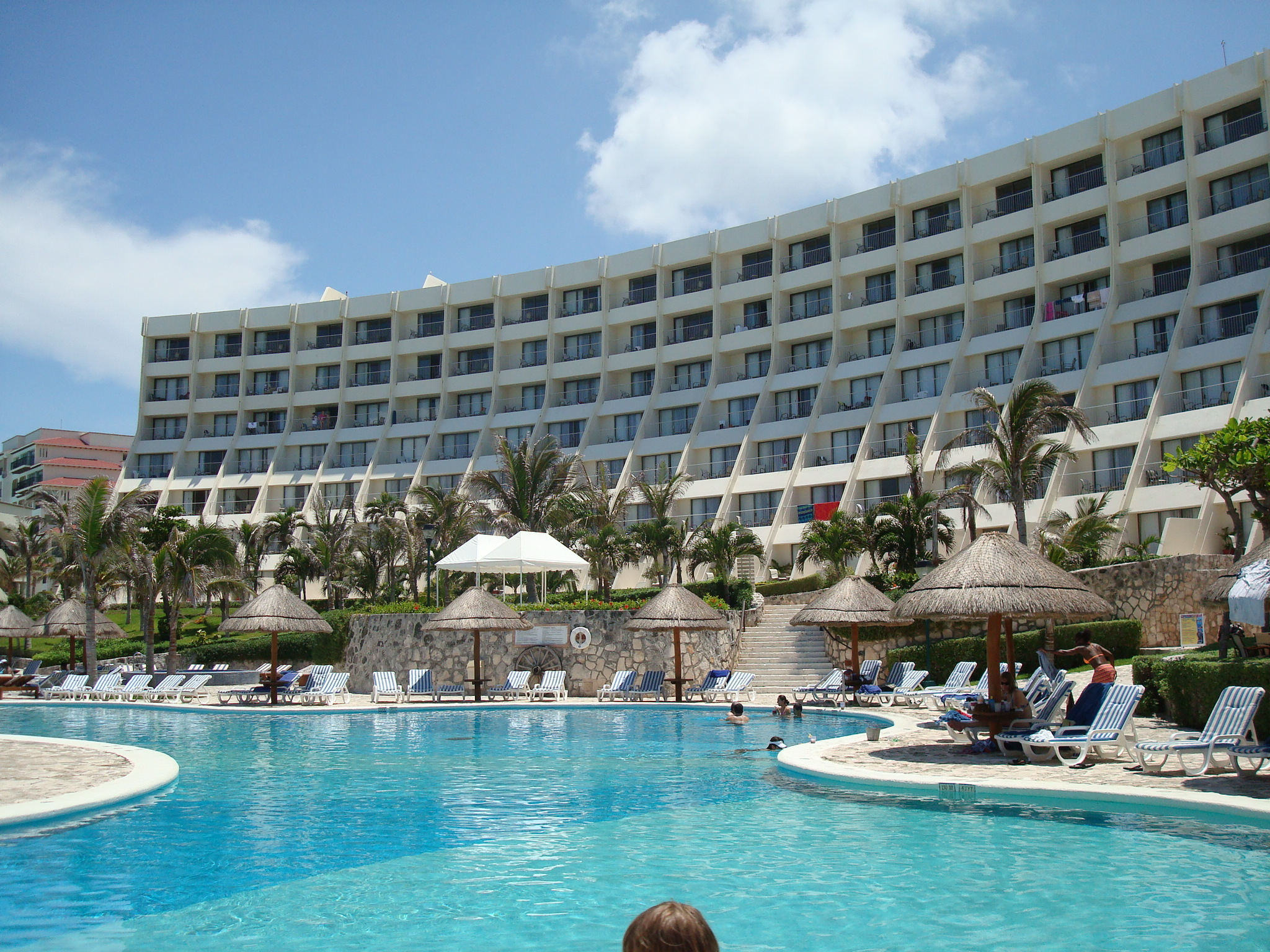
Hotel Hyatt Cancun Caribe, the first to be built for leisure tourism in Cancun

The master plan of Cancún consists of a 12-kilometer strip of hotels on a narrow island surrounded by the Caribbean on one side, and a lagoon on the other, known as the Hotel Zone. The city of Cancún is located on firm land, to the north-west of the island, and is organized in super-blocks with irregular shapes. Each of these super-blocks has internal pedestrian circulations, large park areas and a core with basic services.

In addition to the master plan, Landa Verdugo designed Cancún's first hotel, Hyatt Cancún Caribe, the control tower and hall of the temporary airport that was used during the construction of the city, from 1969 to 1974, and the first houses and camping grounds that were used by the engineers and construction workers that first arrived to work in Cancún.

Landa Verdugo's firm also worked on projects for other tourist cities. From 1974 on, however, these were developed within the government agency that coordinated these projects (FONATUR).

== Other Notable Projects ==
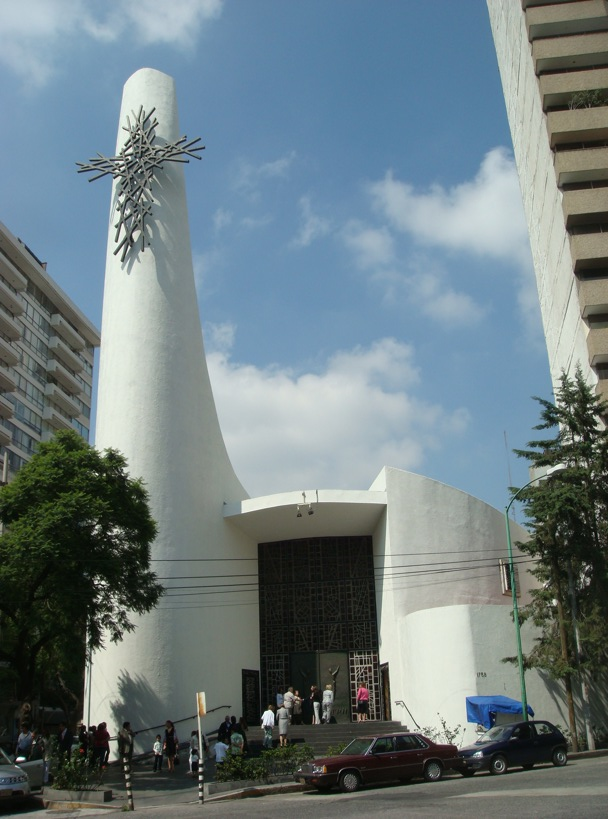
French Parish in Mexico City, from 1967

Other notable projects by architect Agustín Landa Verdugo include the French Parish in Mexico City, for the French Catholic Community, the original facilities of the National Free Textbook Commission (CONALITEG) of the Secretariat of Public Education, and an unbuilt proposal from 1967 to build a new international airport for Mexico City in the town of Zumpango.

== Other Assignments ==
Agustín Landa Verdugo taught at the National University of Mexico for twenty years, from 1948 to 1968. Together with his brother, he presided over one of the school's architecture workshops (Taller 5). Among their students were noted architects and planners Rodolfo Barragán Schwarz, Javier Solórzano and Imanol Ordorika. The latter two worked in Landa Verdugo's firm as workshop leaders.

In addition to his architecture practice and his work in the university, Landa Verdugo led the Bank of Mexico's housing fund (FOVI) from 1963 to 1964, and participated in the creation of the national tourism fund (FONATUR).

In 1990, Agustín Landa Verdugo received the silver medal in the first Mexican architecture biennale for a convent built in Huixquilucan.
