= Punta Cancun Lighthouse =

Lighthouse in Cancún, Quintana Roo, Mexico

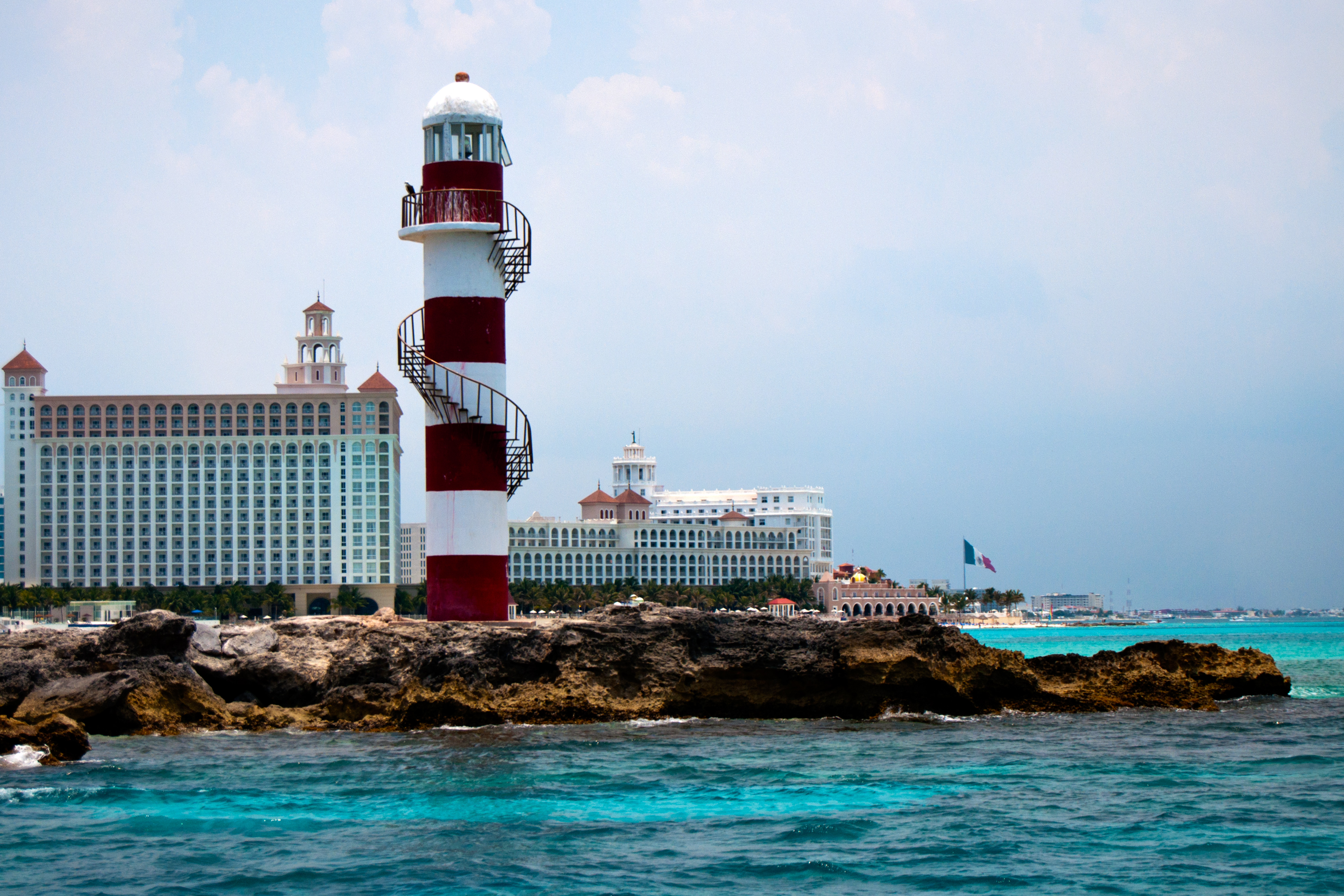
- Location: Cancún
- Coordinates: 21°08′16.5″N 86°44′27.1″W

Tower
- Constructed: 1970
- Foundation: Concrete
- Construction: Stucco over metal lath and plywood
- Height: 48 metres (157 ft)
- Shape: Cylindrical tower
- Markings: Red and white bands

Light
- Lens: White

Punta Cancun Lighthouse (Spanish: "Faro de Punta Cancún", also known simply as the "Cancún Lighthouse") is a lighthouse in the Hotel Zone of Cancún, Quintana Roo.

It is 157 feet tall and was built in 1970. It has become a local landmark and tourist destination for the city.
