= Cave diving regions of the world =

Regions of the world where known cave diving venues exist

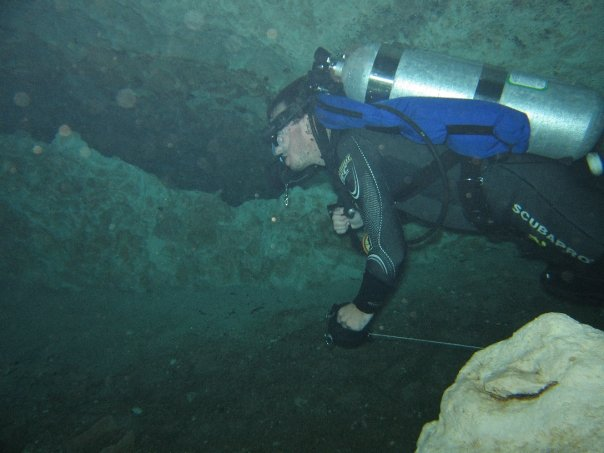
A cave diver running a reel with guide line into the overhead environment

Cave diving is underwater diving in water-filled caves. The equipment used varies depending on the circumstances, and ranges from breath hold to surface supplied, but almost all cave diving is done using scuba equipment, often in specialised configurations with redundancies such as sidemount or backmounted twinset. Recreational cave diving is generally considered to be a type of technical diving due to the lack of a free surface during large parts of the dive, and often involves planned decompression stops. A distinction is made by recreational diver training agencies between cave diving and cavern diving, where cavern diving is deemed to be diving in those parts of a cave where the exit to open water can be seen by natural light. An arbitrary distance limit to the open water surface may also be specified. Despite the risks, water-filled caves attract scuba divers, cavers, and speleologists due to their often unexplored nature, and present divers with a technical diving challenge.

Cave diving venues can be found on all continents except Antarctica, where the average temperature is too low for water to remain liquid in caves.

There are few flooded caves in Africa which are known and accessible. There are several in South Africa, a few in Namibia and Zimbabwe, and some large caves recently discovered in Madagascar.

There are a large number of flooded caves in the limestone regions and other regions of Asia, particularly in the karst regions of China and Southeast Asia. Some are accessible for recreational cave diving, but most have probably not yet been found or explored.

Australia has many spectacular water filled caves and sinkholes, many of them in the Mount Gambier region of South Australia.

Europe has a large number of flooded caves, particularly in the karst regions.

North America has many cave diving venues, particularly in Florida, US, and the Yucatan Peninsula of Mexico.

South America has some cave diving venues in Brazil.

== Africa ==
There are few flooded caves in Africa which are known and accessible.

=== Madagascar ===
- Anjanamba Cave is Africa's longest known flooded cave, with over 10 kilometres (6.2 mi) of passages.

=== South Africa ===
- Boesmansgat is a sinkhole in the Northern Cape province has been dived to 282.6 metres (927 ft) depth.
- Wondergat (more of a cavern, but with a small cave section)
- Komati Springs – a flooded mine
- Cango Caves have flooded sections but are not open to the public in those areas.

=== Zimbabwe ===
- Chinhoyi Caves – Group of caves in north central Zimbabwe

== Asia ==
There are a large number of flooded caves in the limestone regions and other regions of Asia. Some are accessible for recreational cave diving, but most have probably not yet been found or explored.

=== China ===
The Karst landforms in China's Guangxi, Yunnan, Guizhou and other provinces are extremely conducive to the development of caves, and thus give rise to rich groundwater features. 10 underground rivers with a length of more than 80 kilometers have been discovered, with hundreds of caves, skylights, "Feilai Lake" and other landscapes. However, in Guangxi and other places, the caves available for diving also have the characteristics of large water flow, fast speed, deep caverns, complex structure, and harsher cavern environment.

In recent years, Nanning Red Army hole, the sun and the moon hole, Liuzhou Fairy Cave, a series of cave systems attracts a large number of cave diving enthusiasts.

=== Philippines ===
Pawod Underwater Cave in Mactan Island, off the island of Cebu in the Central Philippines was discovered in 2001 by Dr. Alfonso Amores. The discovery opened cave diving for the locals who erstwhile could not afford the expensive course in Florida. In 2012, Jake Miranda, Dr. Alfonso Amores and Bernil H. Gastardo founded the Filipino Cave Divers (FCD). Exploration opened the freshwater caves of Casili, Balamban in Cebu Island and Enchanted River Underwater Cave in Hinatuan, Surigao del Sur in the big southern island of Mindanao. Several more caves in Mindanao have since been discovered and explored – Bababu Lake (Dinagat Island), Pamutuanan Cave (Lianga, Surigao del Sur) and Campomento Cave (Lanuza, Surigao del Sur).

=== West Timor, Indonesia ===
There are a number of freshwater filled cave sites located near and within Kupang, the principal city in West Timor and the provincial capital of East Nusa Tenggara. At least 2 sites have been described: Gua Oehani (translates as the Oehani Cave) and Gua Kristal (translates as the Crystal Cave).

As of 1999, there was no requirement to hold cave diving certification to dive either of these sites. However, competence equivalent to CDAA Advanced Cave and Cave/Advanced Cave respectively appears to be appropriate for these sites.

== Australia ==
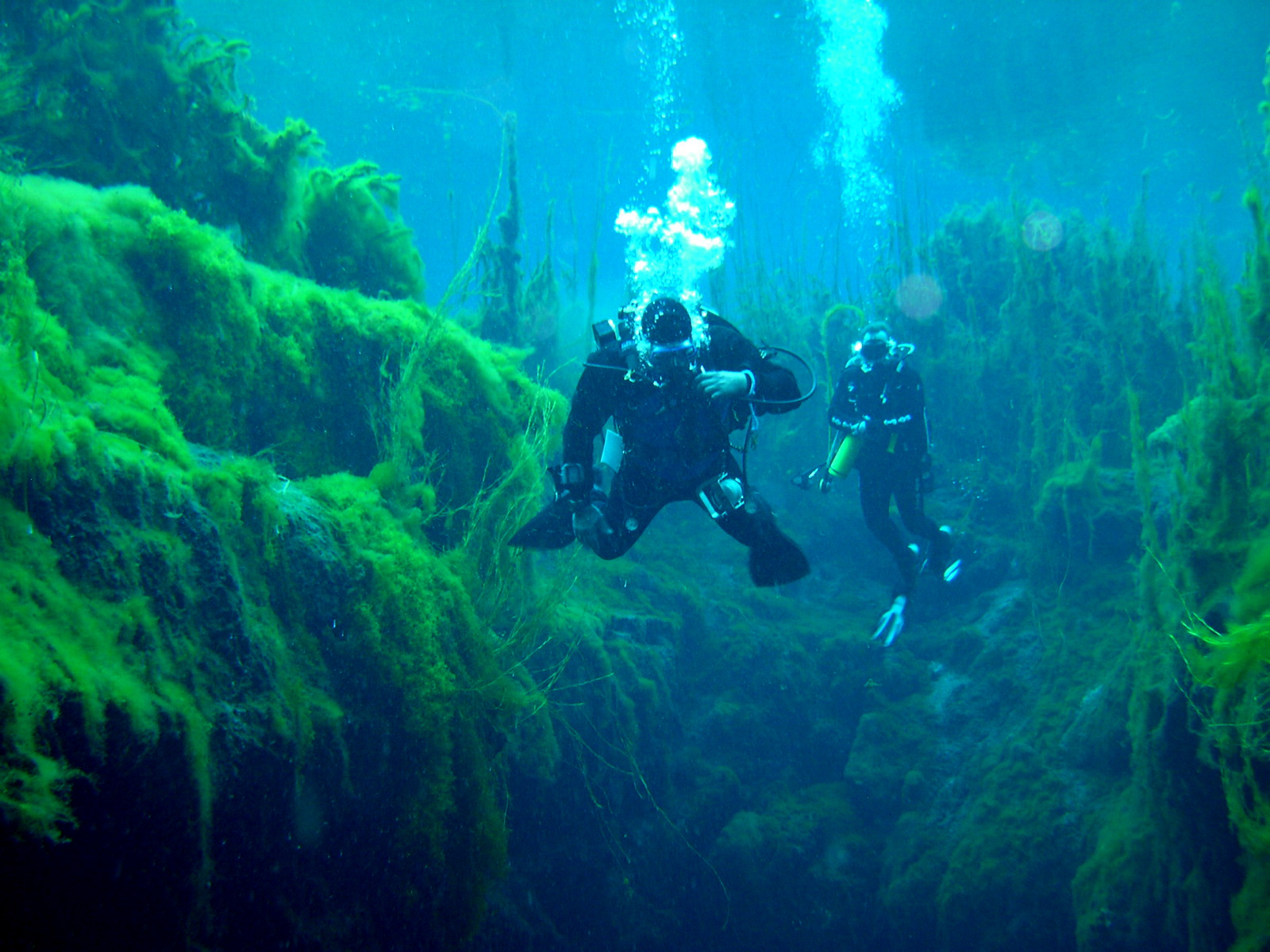
Diving in Piccaninnie Ponds

Australia has many spectacular water filled caves and sinkholes, but unlike the UK, most Australian cave divers come from a general ocean-diving background.

The "air-clear" water conditions experienced in the sinkholes and caves found in the Lower South East (now called the Limestone Coast) of South Australia (SA) has attracted many visiting divers with the first cave and sinkhole dives taking place in the very late 1950s. Until the mid-1980s divers generally used single diving cylinders and homemade torches, and reels, resulting in most of their explorations being limited. Mixed-gas and rebreather technologies can now be used in many sites. The area is usually known within the cave diving community as the Mount Gambier region.

A series of incidents between 1969 and 1974 in the former Lower South East of SA in which 11 divers died (including a triple and a quadruple fatality) in the following four karst features – Kilsbys Hole, Piccaninnie Ponds, Death Cave (also known as Alleyns Cave) and The Shaft – created much public comment and led to the formation of the Cave Divers Association of Australia Inc. (CDAA) in September 1973. The introduction of a testing program by the CDAA in 1974, which involved the assessment of prospective cave divers' cave diving ability led to a reduced fatality rate. In 1989, this testing system was replaced by a training system which consists of three levels of qualification – Deep Cavern, Cave and Advanced Cave. Five further deaths have occurred since 1974; two died at Piccaninnie Ponds in 1984, one person died at Kilsbys Hole in 2010, and two people died in separate incidents at Tank Cave in 2011 including noted cave diver Agnes Milowka.

During the 1980s, the Nullarbor Plain was recognized as a major cave-diving area, with one cave, Cocklebiddy, being explored for more than 6 kilometres, involving the use of large sleds to which were attached numerous diving cylinders and other paraphernalia, and which were then laboriously pushed through the cave by the divers. In more recent years divers have been utilizing compact diver-towing powered scooters, but the dive is still technically extremely challenging.

A number of other very significant caves have also been discovered during the past 20 years or so; the 10+ (Lineal) kilometre long Tank Cave near Millicent in the Limestone Coast, other very large features on the Nullarbor and the adjacent Roe Plain as well as a number of specific sites elsewhere, and nowadays the cave diving community utilizes many techniques, equipment and standards common internationally.

The Cave Divers Association of Australia is the major cave diving organisation in Australia and is responsible for the administration of cave diving at many sites. All cave diving in the Limestone Coast as well as at some New South Wales sites and the Nullarbor requires divers to be members of the CDAA, whether in the capacity of a visitor or a trained and assessed member. A number of other organisations participate in cave diving activities within Australia. The Australian Speleological Federation Cave Diving Group which was formed in 2005 coordinates projects focused on exploration and mapping at sites throughout Australia. The following diving training organisations offer courses in various aspects of cave diving via instructors either resident in Australia or visiting from overseas – Global Underwater Explorers, International Association of Nitrox and Technical Divers and Technical Diving International.

== New Zealand ==
- Pearse Resurgence – Source of the Pearse Stream on Mt. Arthur, New Zealand South Island

== Europe ==
=== Bosnia and Herzegovina ===
Una National Park, in the Bihac municipality, encompasses the valley of the Una River and is a hotspot for speleological research expeditions. Thanks to the area's position between the end of two large karst systems: Plješivica and Grmeč, the river abounds with shallow water sources and a significant number of underwater caves. So far, 10 large caves have been registered, only five of which have been partially examined. Divers who have explored Klokot Spring have managed to reach a depth of 104.5 metres (343 feet; 57 fathoms), though the bottom of the spring has yet to be touched. Another cave has been explored to the length of 150 m (490 ft), and is said to be an ideal destination for cave divers in training.

=== Czech Republic ===
Hranice Abyss, or Hranická Propast, is the world's deepest known underwater cavity. It beat the previous record holder, Pozzo del Merro in Italy, by 12 m (39 ft). Polish explorer Krzysztof Starnawski, who has explored the upper parts of the flooded fissure for decades, has determined the depth to be at least 404 m (1,325 ft) . As of 2017, divers have yet to reach the bottom of the cave.

=== Hungary ===
Molnár János Cave is an active thermal water cave located on the western banks of the Danube river. Belonging to the Buda Hills karst system, which is home to many of Budapest's famed hot springs, the temperature of the water sits between 20 and 28 °C (68 and 82 °F) year-round. Whilst the first underwater explorations began in the 1950s, the cave wasn't successfully charted until the 70s and 80s when a group of divers mapped out more than 400 m (1,300 ft) of the cave system. The cave, which contains a labyrinth passages, currently stretches to over 6 km (4 mi; 20,000 ft) though there are many more untouched sections to explore.

After the death of a diver in 2011, the Hungarian government imposed strict rules for diving. To dive at Molnár János, divers must have at least an intro-to-cave-diving certification or they cannot dive in the tunnels; they must have dive insurance that covers cave diving; and they must have air supplied in the form of double tanks, stages or a rebreather. In addition, each dive is accompanied by a guide, to minimize the risk of a wrong turn.

=== Iceland ===
Silfra is a fissure between the North American and Eurasian tectonic plates in Thingvellir National Park. It is the only place in the world where you can dive or snorkel directly in a crack between two tectonic plates. The tunnel from the entrance of Silfra to the cave is commonly known as ‘The Tunnel’, due to the strong current that ‘flushes’ divers attempting to swim through. This tunnel is rarely dived due to the dangerous head-first vertical dive needed to pass through. The deepest part of the cave is at least 63 m (207 ft) deep, and has only been dived by a few people because of the narrow and unstable passages.

=== Ireland ===
Pollatoomary in the Partry Mountains near Killavally, Westport, County Mayo, is the deepest explored underwater cave in Ireland.

=== Italy ===
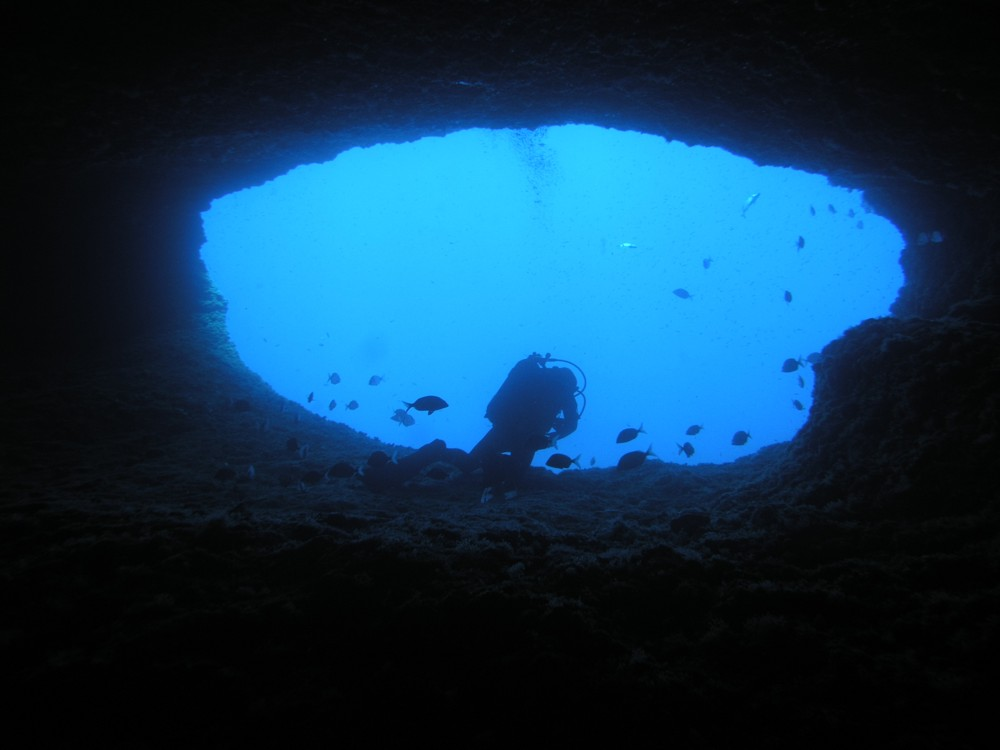
The Nereo Cave "Belvedere" watching terrace, south upside entrance

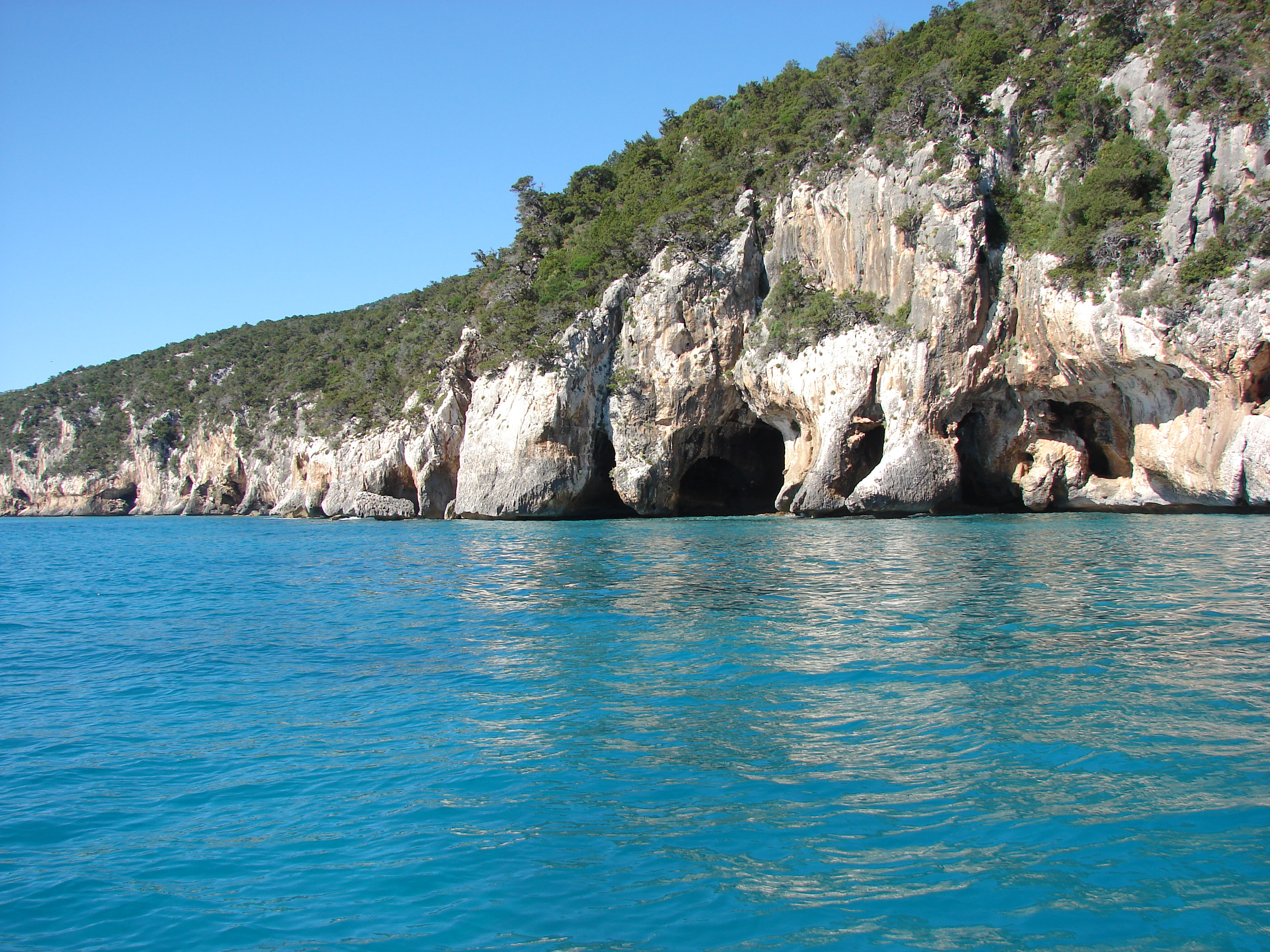
Bue Marino caves in Sardinia

In the north west of Sardinia, close to Porto Conte bay, Alghero territory, there are more than 300 caves above and below water, with about 30 large, and many smaller, underwater sea caves in the limestone cliffs of Capo Caccia and Punta Giglio. The Nereo Cave is the most important and is considered the largest in the Mediterranean Sea. On the east side of Sardinia there are many underwater cave systems starting from the Gennargentu Mountains, with underwater rivers. There is a fresh water cave of more than 110 m (360 ft) depth in this area.

Cala Gonone is considered the best departure point for cave diving in Sardinia's largest cave systems which are usually reached by sea. Bue Marino is the longest known. Some other known caves in the area are Cala Luna (Moon beach), Bel Torrente (with a great halocline), Grotta del Fico, Utopia, Euphoria, amongst others. The caves are to be dived by experienced and trained cave divers with required certification levels only. Some known dive centers catering to this technical cave level dives include Base 1 that follows the GUE standards for diving and Protec

=== Norway ===
Jordbrugrotta (also known as Pluragrotta) is a cave in Rana Municipality. It is the deepest cave in Northern Europe.

Cave divers occasionally visit Jordbrugrotta which is the most dived cave in Scandinavia. Most of the other approximately 200 caves in Rana are not suitable for diving, and formation of caves has been limited due most of the rock being granite. Another diveable cave nearby is Litjåga. Damming of Kallvatnet made diving in Jordbrugrotta possible. There have been multiple cases of fatalities and injuries among visiting cave divers, but the accident rate is not out of proportion with the number of divers. The cave's passages were formed by the river Plura's flow through porous limestone. Rock formations include marble. Visibility in the cave is good.

=== Slovakia ===
- Slovak Opal Mine, near Prešov. The mine consists of around 22 km (14 mi) of tunnels; with some measuring as deep as 150 m (490 ft).

=== Spain ===
- The Cueva Del Agua cave system in Murcia is one of the few warm water cave systems in Europe, with clear water at a constant 29 °C.
- Pozo Azul is near Covenera, north of Burgos has four sumps separated by dry sections. The first sump has high headroom with an average depth of 10 and maximum 21 m, and is about 700 m long The second sump is wider and has lower flow and consequently more silt deposits and a maximum depth of 71 m In 2011 the cave was explored to 9685 m, of which 9135 m was underwater. The fourth sump remained undived at the time.

=== United Kingdom ===
UK requirements are generally that all people wishing to take up cave diving must be competent cavers before they start cave diving. This is primarily because most British cave dives are at the far end of dry caves. There are individuals that begin cave diving directly from the recreational diving, but they represent a minority in the UK, and represent only a few percent of the Cave Diving Group (CDG).

== North America ==
=== Bahamas ===
The caves and caverns of Grand Bahama contain an immense underwater cavern with a vast flooded labyrinth of caverns, caves and submerged tunnels that honeycomb the entire island of Grand Bahama and the surrounding sea bed. The inland caves are not abundant with life, but do contain creatures living in the caves other than the migrating gray snappers. Residents of these caves include a type of blind cave fish and remipedia that don't pose any threat to cave divers.

The caves in the Bahamas were formed during the last ice age. With much of the Earth's water held in the form of glacial ice, the sea level fell hundreds of feet, leaving most of the Bahama banks, which are now covered in water, high and dry. Rain falling on the most porous limestone slowly filtered down to sea level forming a lens where it contacted the denser salt water of the ocean permeating the spongy limestone. The water at the interface was acidic enough to dissolve away the limestone and form the caves. Then, as more ice formed and the sea level dropped even further, the caves became dry and rainwater dripping through the ceiling over thousands of years created the incredible crystal forests of stalagmites which now decorate the caves. Finally, when the ice melted and the sea level rose, the caves were reclaimed by the sea.

=== Dominican Republic ===
There is a growing number of known water filled caves in the Dominican Republic, spread all over the island. Regions with underwater caves include Santo Domingo, Pedernales, Cabrera, Bayahibe and others.

Active exploration is being conducted by the Dominican Republic Speleological Society which is working together with local institutions as well as international scientists to further explore all the cave systems possibilities and focusing in the preservation.

The longest known cave in the island is El Toro which is about 1,800 m (6,000 ft) in length.

The best known caves in the island are Cueva Taina, El Tildo, El Chicho and El Dudu, which have easy access to the water and with a good level of safety outside of the water as they are in private properties or national parks.

Cave diving is playing an important role in science in the DR, in the last 3 years the DRSS team together with international scientists and "Museo del Hombre Dominicano" has found a new species of cave bacteria, a number of new and extinct bat species, the first evidence of extinct crocodiles in the DR, fossil snakes, birds, sloths and remains of extinct monkeys and other ancient cave life. DRSS has cataloged over 120 new springs all over the island in which many have caverns and cave systems attached.

Safety concerns in Dominican Republic

An important safety issue on the island is untrained cave diving, principally led by unprofessional dive stores and guides risking their customers' lives. Unprofessional and unsafe practices of dive guides may be reported to the relevant dive agency and to the Dominican Republic Speleological Society.

=== Mexico ===
Yucatán Peninsula

While there is great potential for cave diving in the continental karst throughout Mexico, the majority of cave diving in Mexico occurs in the Yucatán Peninsula. While there are thousands of deep pit cenotes throughout the Yucatán Peninsula including in the states of Yucatán and Campeche, the extensive sub-horizontal flooded cave networks for which the peninsula is known are essentially limited to a 10 km wide strip of the Caribbean coastline in the state of Quintana Roo extending south from Cancún to the Tulum Municipality and the Sian Ka'an Biosphere Reserve, although some short segments of underwater cave have been explored on the north-west coast (Yucatán State).

In the Yucatán Peninsula, any surface opening where groundwater can be reached is called cenote, which is a Spanish form of the Maya word d'zonot. The cave systems formed as normal caves underwater, but upper sections drained becoming air filled during past low sea levels. During this vadose, or air filled state, abundant speleothem deposits formed. The caves and the vadose speleothem were reflooded and became hydraulically reactivated as rising sea levels also raised the water table. These caves are therefore polygenetic, having experienced more than one cycle of formation below the water table. Polygenetic coastal cave systems with underwater speleothem are globally common, with notable examples being on the Balearic Islands (Mallorca, Menorca) of Spain, the islands of the Bahamas, Bermuda, Cuba, and many more.

The underwater speleothems in the Yucatán Peninsula are fragile. If a diver accidentally breaks a formation, it will not reform as long as the cave is underwater so active cave conservation diving techniques are necessary. The Quintana Roo caves are extremely complex with anastomotic interconnected passages. When diving through the caves, they appear to have many offshoots and junctions, requiring careful navigation with permanent tees or the implementation of jumps in the guideline.

The beginning of the 1980s brought the first cave divers from the U.S. to the Yucatán Peninsula, Quintana Roo to explore cenotes such as Carwash, Naharon and Maya Blue, and to central Mexico where resurgence rivers such as Rio Mante, and sinkholes such as Zacaton were documented.

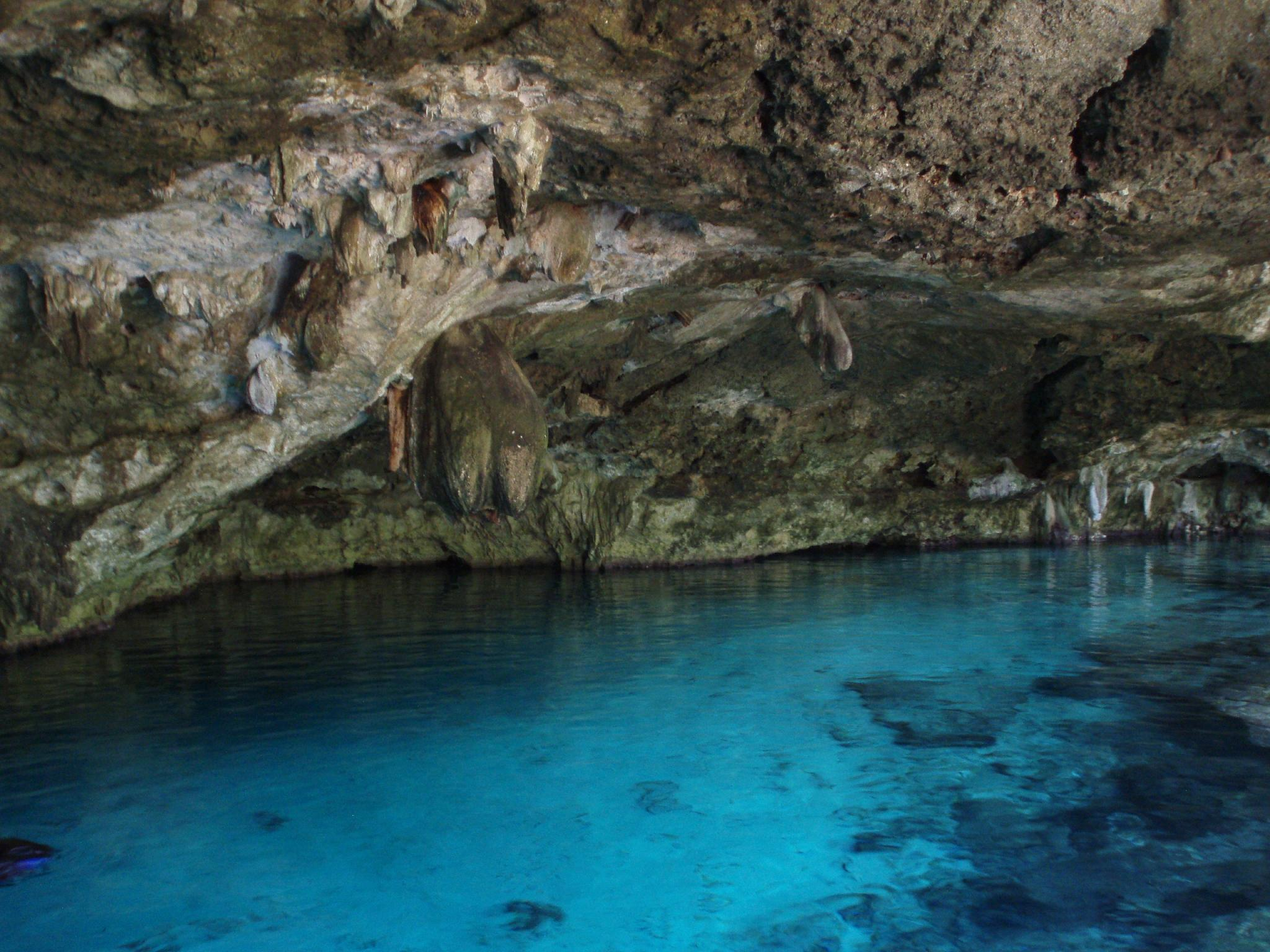
Entrance to Dos Ojos

In the Yucatán, the 1980s ended with the discoveries of the Dos Ojos and Nohoch Nah Chich cave systems which led into a long competition of which exploration team had the longest recorded underwater cave system in the world at the time.

The beginning of the 1990s led into the discovery of underwater caves such as Aereolito on the island of Cozumel, ultimately leading to the 5th biggest underwater cave in the world.

By the mid-1990s a push into the central Yucatán Peninsula discovered a large number of deep sinkholes, or pit cenotes, such as Sabak Ha and Utzil, and deep caves such as Chacdzinikche, Dzibilchaltun and Kankirixche that have since been explored and mapped. These deep caves of the central Yucatán remain largely unexplored due to the number of cenotes in the State of Yucatán, and the depths, which require technical diving techniques or rebreathers. At the end of the last millennium closed circuit rebreathers were used to explore these caves.

By the end of the 1990s, The Pit in the Dos Ojos cave system located 5.8 km from the Caribbean coast had been discovered, and by 2008 it had been dived to 119 m deep. At that time, technical diving and rebreather equipment and techniques became commonplace.

By the turn of the millennium the longest underwater cave system at that time, Ox Bel Ha was established by cave diving explorers whose combined efforts and information helped join segments of previously explored caves. The use of hand held GPS technology and aerial and satellite images for reconnaissance during exploration became common. New technology such as improved rebreathers and diver propulsion vehicles (DPVs) became available and were utilized for longer penetration dives. In January 2013, Ox Bel Ha included 242 km of underwater passage (see QRSS for current statistics).

Active exploration continues in the new millennium. Most cave diving exploration is now conducted on the basis of "mini projects" lasting 1–7 days, and occurring many times a year, and these may include daily commutes from home to jungle dive base camps located within 1 hour from road access.

Starting in 2006 a number of large previously explored and mapped cave systems have been shown to be connected using sidemount and often no-mount cave diving techniques to pass through tight cave passages, indicating the largest known connected underwater cave system on the planet, Sac Actun, which is 220 km long (see QRSS for current statistics).

Many cave maps have been published by the Quintana Roo Speleological Survey (QRSS).

=== United States ===
Central and Northern Florida

The largest and most active cave diving community in the United States is in north-central Florida. The North Floridan Aquifer expels groundwater through numerous first-magnitude springs, each providing an entrance to the aquifer's labyrinthine cave system. These high-flow springs have resulted in Florida cave divers developing special techniques for exploring them, since some have such strong currents that it is impossible to swim against them.

The longest known underwater cave system in the United States, The Leon Sinks cave system, near Tallahassee, Florida, has multiple interconnected sinks and springs spanning two counties (Leon & Wakulla). One main resurgence of the system, Wakulla Springs, is explored exclusively by a very successful and pioneering project called the Woodville Karst Plain Project (WKPP), although other individuals and groups like the US Deep Cave Diving Team, have explored portions of Wakulla Springs in the past.

One deep underwater cave in the United States is Weeki Wachee Spring. Due to its strong outflow, divers have had limited success penetrating this first magnitude spring until 2007, when drought conditions eased the out-flowing water allowing team divers from Karst Underwater Research to penetrate to depths of 120 m (400 ft)

The Florida caves are formed from geologically young limestone with moderate porosity. The absence of speleothem decorations which can only form in air filled caves, indicates that the flooded Florida caves have a single genetic phase origin, having remained water filled even during past low sea levels. In plan form, the caves are relatively linear with a limited number of side passages allowing for most of the guidelines to be simple paths with few permanent tees. It is common practice for cave divers in Florida to joint a main line with a secondary line using a jump reel when exploring side passages, in order to maintain a continuous guideline to the surface.

Texas

The current deepest known underwater cave in the United States as of 2013 is Phantom Springs Cave located in west Texas. Phantom Springs has been explored down to 141 m (462 ft) in water filled cave passages.

== South America ==
=== Brazil ===
In Brazil there is cavern diving in Chapada da Diamantina, in Bahia state; Bonito, in Mato Grosso do Sul state; and Mariana, where there is also cave diving (visiting Mina da Passagem), in Minas Gerais state. For cave diving in Mariana a cave diver certification will be required.
