= Sistema Sac Actun =

Flooded cave system in the Yucatan Peninsula, Mexico

- Location within Mexico
- Location: Tulum Municipality, Quintana Roo, Mexico
- Coordinates: 20°14′47.6″N 87°27′50.8″W
- Depth: 119.2 meters (391 ft)
- Length: Underwater: 378.56 km (235.23 mi); Total: 386.122 km (239.925 mi)
- Discovery: November 26, 1987
- Geology: Limestone
- Entrances: 228 Cenotes
- Difficulty: Advanced cave diving

Sistema Sac Actun (Yucatec Maya: sak aktun, lit. 'white cave', Spanish: sistema, lit. 'system') is an underwater cave system situated along the Caribbean coast of the Yucatán Peninsula with passages to the north and west of the city of Tulum. Discovery of a connection to Sistema Dos Ojos in 2018 made it the longest known underwater cave system. As of January 2023, it is the second longest underwater cave system in the world, only surpassed by Sistema Ox Bel Ha.

The remains of a mastodon and a human female that might be the oldest evidence of human habitation in the Americas have been found in the cave.

== History of exploration ==
Exploration started from Gran Cenote 5 kilometers (3.1 mi) west of Tulum. The whole of the explored cave system lies within the Municipality of Tulum, in the state of Quintana Roo.

In early 2007, the underwater cave Sistema Nohoch Nah Chich was connected into and subsumed into Sac Actun making it the longest surveyed underwater cave system in the world. Sac Actun measured 230.8 km (143.4 mi) (after connecting with Sistema Aktun Hu (34 km (21 mi)(in January 2011) and is, as of January 2023 with an explored length of 259.5 kilometers (161.2 mi), only surpassed by the Sistema Ox Bel Ha at 435.8 kilometers (270.8 mi). Since early 2007, these two caves have frequently exchanged the title of world's longest underwater cave. Including connected dry caves makes Sistema Sac Actun 386.122 km (239.925 mi) long, the second longest cave in Mexico and third longest worldwide.

On December 9, 2004, after a dive with two other teammates, Kent Hirsch and Michael Nast were drowned deep in the cave as they got lost and exhausted their oxygen supply.

In 2018, the discovery of a link between the Sac Actun system (reported to be 263 km (163 mi) long) and the Dos Ojos system in Tulum, Quintana Roo (84 km (52 mi) long) was reported. The connection was found by the Gran Maya Aquifer Project (GAM), led by the cave diver and explorer Robbie Schmittner. The combined system is reported to be the world's second longest underwater cave system known.

== Upper Paleolithic remains ==
In March 2008, three members of the Proyecto Espeleológico de Tulum and Global Underwater Explorers dive team, Alex Alvarez, Franco Attolini, and Alberto Nava, explored a section of Sistema Aktun Hu known as the Hoyo Negro pit. At a depth of 60 meters (200 ft) the divers located the remains of a mastodon, as well as a human skull at 43 meters (141 ft) that might be the oldest evidence of human habitation in the Americas. Additional bones were located and the skeleton was later identified as that of a teenage female now referred to as Naia.

== See also ==
- Eve of Naharon – Hominin fossil
- List of caves
- List of caves in Mexico
- List of sinkholes of Mexico – Links to Wikipedia articles on sinkholes, blue holes, dolines, cenotes, and pit caves
- Paleo-Indians – Classification term given to the first peoples who entered the American continents
- Settlement of the Americas – Prehistoric migration from Asia to the Americas
- Speleology – Science of cave and karst systems
