= QRSS =

QRSS may refer to:

- The Quintana Roo Speleological Survey, a project that supports safe exploration of the caves in Quintana Roo, Mexico
- Quasi Random Signal Source, a test pattern of the bit error rate test (BERT) methods for digital communication circuits
- QRSS (amateur radio), a very low speed transmission mode used by amateur radio operators
- QRSs, the plural of QRS patterns in electrocardiograms
