= Sistema Nohoch Nah Chich =

Flooded cave system in Mexico

- Location within Mexico
- Location: Tulum Municipality, Quintana Roo, Mexico
- Coordinates: 20°17′55″N 87°24′13″W
- Depth: 71.6 meters (235 ft)
- Length: 67 kilometers (42 mi)
- Discovery: November 26, 1987
- Geology: Limestone
- Entrances: 36 Cenotes
- Difficulty: Advanced cave diving
- Cave survey: CEDAM, SAET

Sistema Nohoch Nah Chich (from Spanish and Yucatec Maya meaning "Giant Birdcage System"), is located 16.5 kilometers (10.3 mi) south of Akumal in Tulum Municipality of Quintana Roo state, southeastern Mexico. It is part of the Sistema Sac Actun underwater cave systems.

It is an extensive water filled cave system connected with the Caribbean Sea, fed via a coastal spring in a cenote with a variety of names, including Cenote Manati, Cenote Tankah, and Casa Cenote after a nearby restaurant. The explored cave system extends to approximately 8 kilometers (5.0 mi) inland from the coast.

Sistema Nohoch Nah Chich was discovered to be connected to the Sistema Sac Actun, making the Sac Actun the longest surveyed underwater cave system in the world.

== Exploration ==
For more than ten years the system was extensively explored by dedicated cave divers starting from Cenote Nohoch Nah Chich.

In 1987 Mike Madden of CEDAM International Dive Center established the CEDAM Cave Diving Team principally to conduct annual exploration projects to focus on cave exploration, while a number of cave research efforts were logistically supported, with contributions in the fields of karst hydrogeology, water chemistry, microbiology, cave ecology, and underwater archaeology.

The technique of establishing jungle exploration camps at newly found cenotes and cave entrances of Sistema Nohoch Nah Chich was developed and refined during many cave exploration projects, thus allowing cave diving exploration effort to continue more efficiently at the edges of the known caves. The main camp of exploration became Cenote "Far Point Station", located 6 kilometers (3.7 mi) from the coast, and 2.8 kilometers (1.7 mi) further inland than Main Base Camp situated at the main Nohoch Nah Chich Cenote entrance.

During the Nohoch 1997 expedition, the 60 kilometers (37 mi) of total explored cave passage mark was surpassed.

In early 2007, Nohoch Nah Chich included 36 cenotes and had a recorded length of 67 kilometers (42 mi), when it was connected to, and subsumed into the 14 kilometers (8.7 mi) longer Sistema Sac Actun by the Sac Actun Exploration Team (SAET). This portion of the system is now called the "Nohoch Nah Chich Historical section", where with 71.6 meters (235 ft) also the greatest depth of the entire system was reached at "The Blue Abyss".

== See also ==
- Sistema Sac Actun and Sistema Dos Ojos cave systems
- List of caves in Mexico
- Riviera Maya – Tourist resort district near Cancún, Mexico
