= Choo-Ha =

Small cenote close to the Mayan site of Cobá in central Yucatán Peninsula

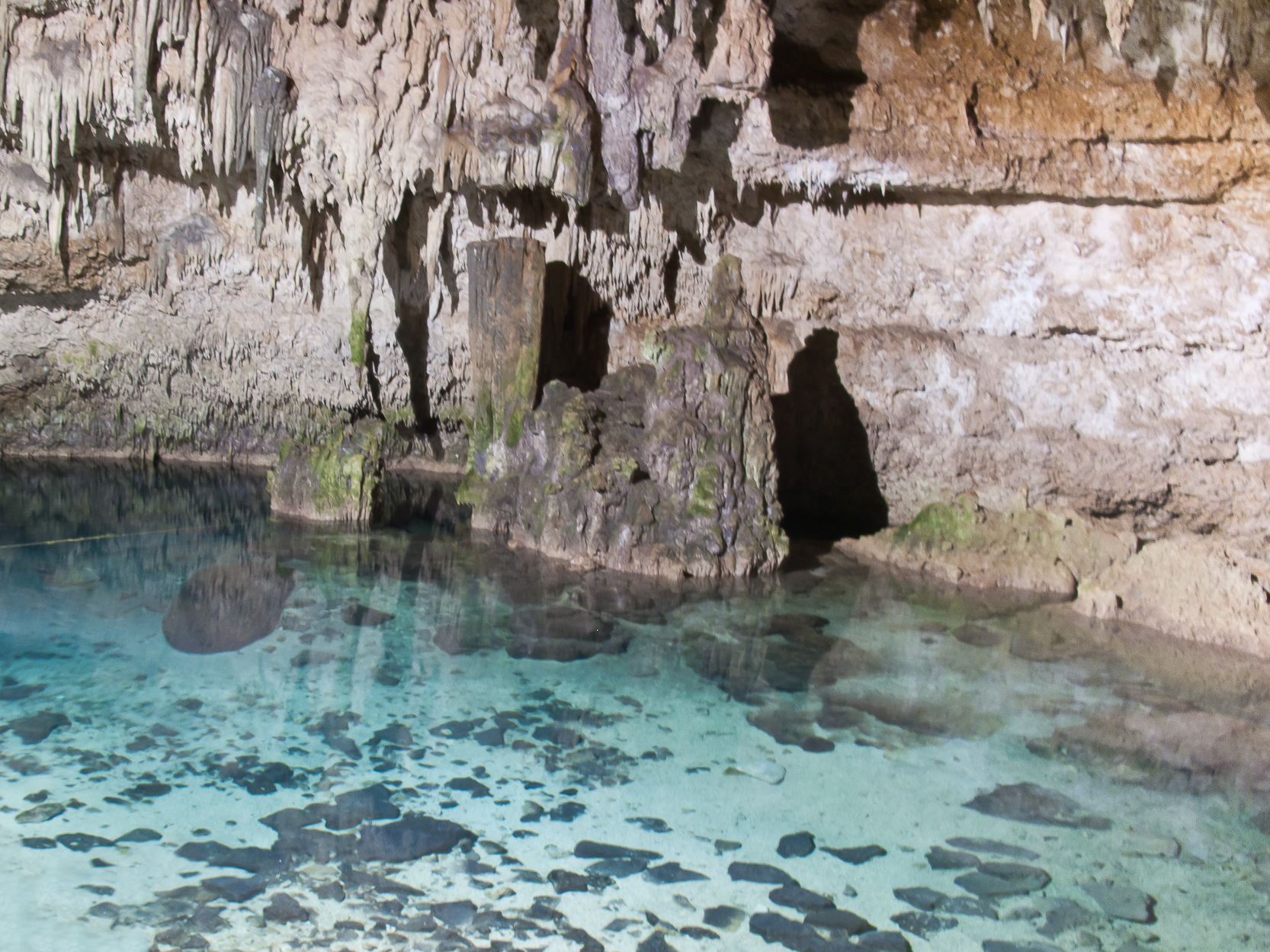

- Location within Mexico
- Location: Quintana Roo, Mexico
- Coordinates: 20°26′8″N 87°46′6″W
- Geology: Limestone
- Entrances: 1 cenotes

Choo-Ha, Tankach-Ha and Multun-Ha are a series of small cenotes close to the Mayan site of Cobá in central Yucatán Peninsula. All of them are accessible to the public for swimming. Choo-Ha has a small entrance of only about 3 by 4 meters.

== Fauna ==
Small fish and turtles live in this cenote. Visitors must take a shower to clean themselves before swimming.

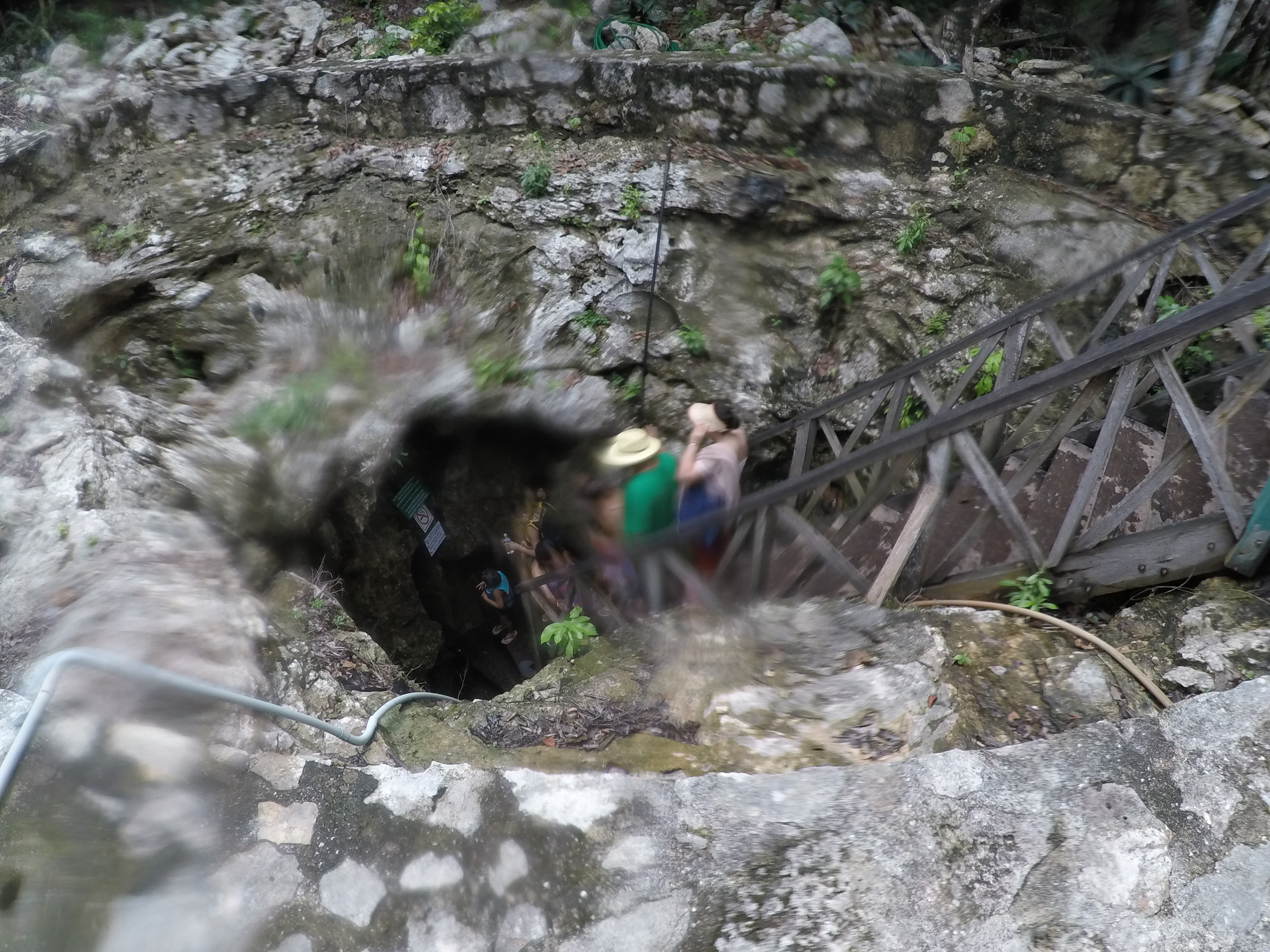
Entrance to Choo-Ha
