= Cult of the Cenote =

Legendary Mayan tradition

The Cult of the Cenote was a legendary tradition among some Maya people, particularly under the governance of the Mayapan in the Yucatán Peninsula. The tradition includes throwing selected people in the city's cenote as a human sacrifice as well as precious stones like gold, jade and other ornaments for the rain god, Chaac. The Sacred Cenote is surrounded by ancient Mayan ruins known as the Chichen Itza which translates into the "mouth of the well in Itza". The ceremonies conducted in the Sacred Cenote were expected by the people to produce rain.

== Spanish accounts on the rituals ==
One account in 1579, a ritual was made by throwing women selected by each lord into the cenote to ask for a good year. The women were thrown during the break of dawn and by midday, the women shouted so that the people could throw them a rope for them to get out and they will be asked if they will have a good or bad year. Another account in 1612 where virgins (doncellas) were killed as a sacrifice because the Mayans needed it to rain for their maize. A testimony made on August 11, 1562 in which the leader Lorenzo Cocom had sacrificed young boys into the cenote three months earlier.
