= Cenote =

Natural pit or sinkhole that exposes groundwater underneath

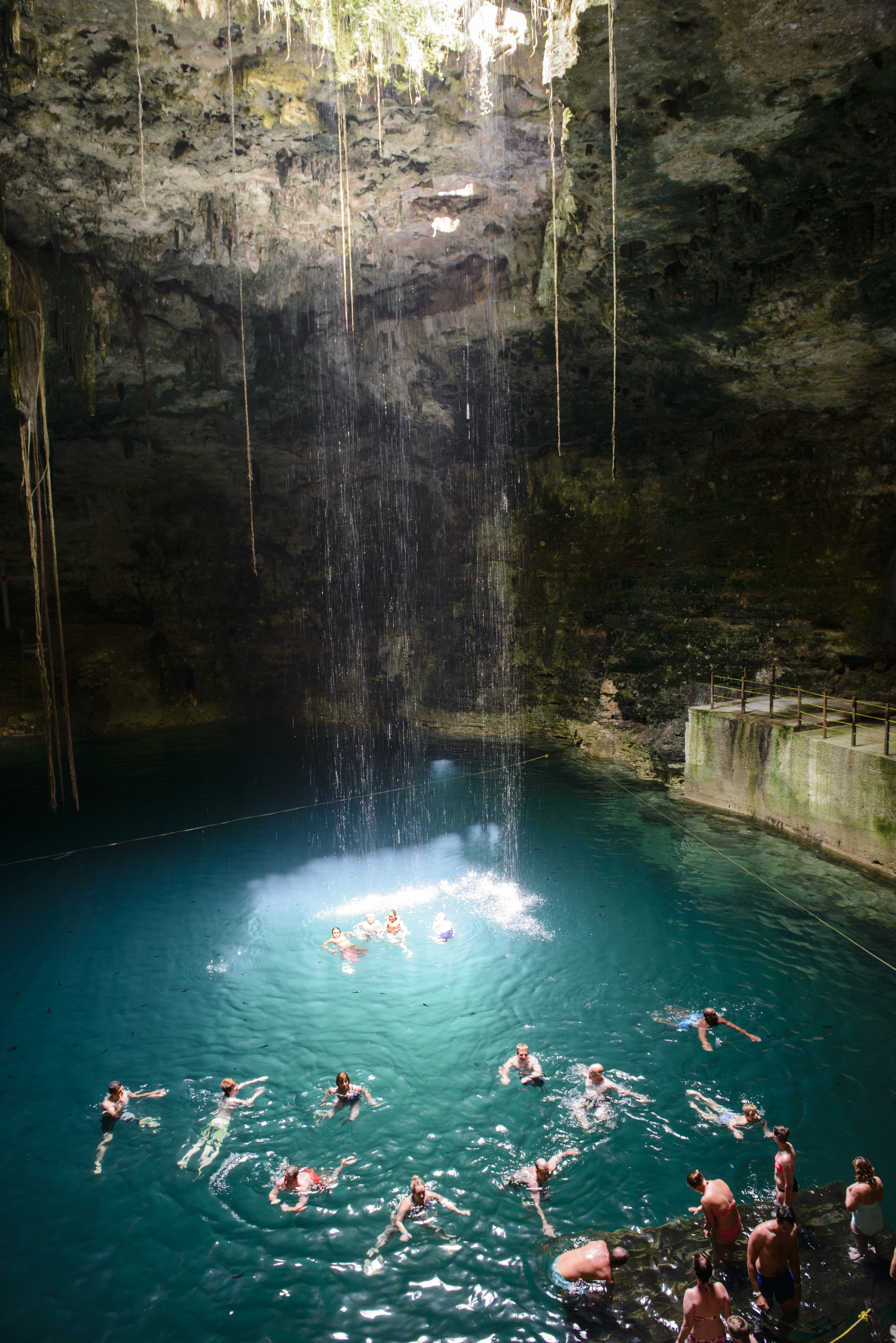
Cenote at Hubiku, Yucatan

A cenote (English: /sɪ.ˈnoʊ.ti/ or /sɛ.ˈnoʊ.teɪ/, sih-NO-tee or seh-NO-tay; Latin American Spanish: [seˈnote]) is a natural pit, or sinkhole, resulting when a collapse of limestone bedrock exposes groundwater. The term originated on the Yucatán Peninsula of Mexico, where the ancient Maya commonly used cenotes for water supplies, and occasionally, for sacrificial offerings. The name derives from a word used by the lowland Yucatec Maya—tsʼonoʼot—to refer to any location with accessible groundwater.

Cenotes are common geological forms in low-altitude regions, particularly on islands (such as Cefalonia, Greece), coastlines, and platforms with young post-Paleozoic limestone with little soil development. The term cenote, initially applying only to the features in Yucatán, has since been used by researchers to refer to similar karst features in other places, such as in Cuba, Australia, Europe, and the United States.

== Definition and description ==
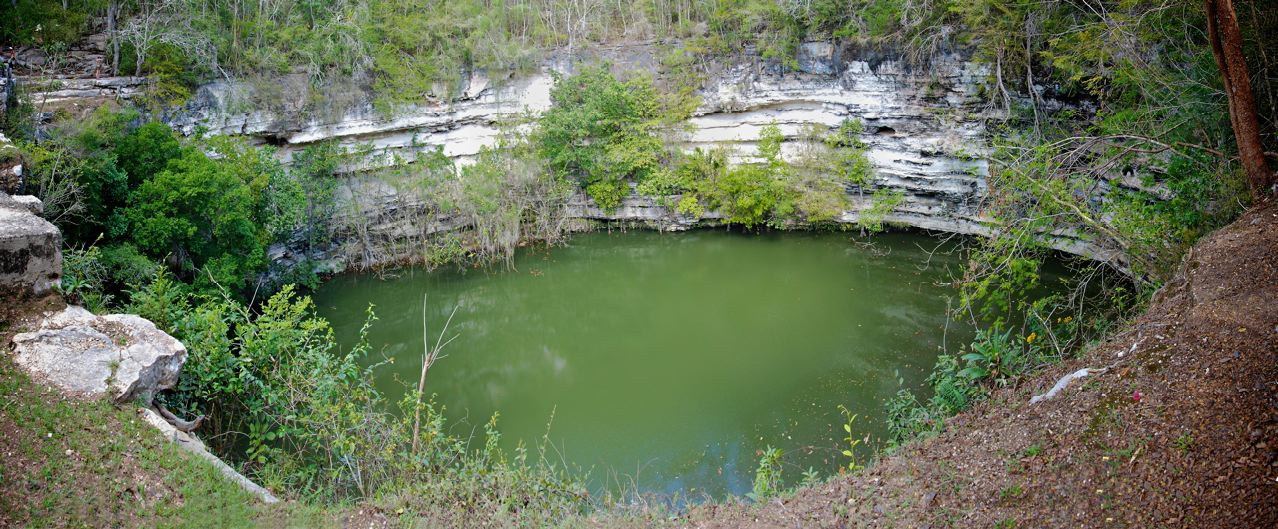
The Sacred Cenote at Chichen Itza, Mexico

Cenotes are surface connections to subterranean water bodies. While the best-known cenotes are large open-water pools measuring tens of meters in diameter, such as those at Chichen Itza in Mexico, the most significant number of cenotes are smaller sheltered sites and do not necessarily have any surface exposed water. Some cenotes are only found through small <1 m (3 ft) diameter holes created by tree roots, with human access through enlarged holes, such as the cenotes Choo-Ha, Tankach-Ha, and Multum-Ha near Tulum. The Yucatán Peninsula in Mexico alone has an estimated 10,000 cenotes.

Cenote water is often transparent, as the water comes from rain water filtering slowly through the ground, and therefore contains very little suspended particulate matter. The groundwater flow rate within a cenote may be very slow. In many cases, cenotes are areas where sections of the cave roof have collapsed, revealing an underlying cave system, and the water flow rates may be much faster: up to 10 kilometers (6 mi) per day.

The Yucatan cenotes attract cavern and cave divers who have documented extensive flooded cave systems, some of which have been explored for lengths of 376 km (234 mi) or more.

== Geology and hydrology ==
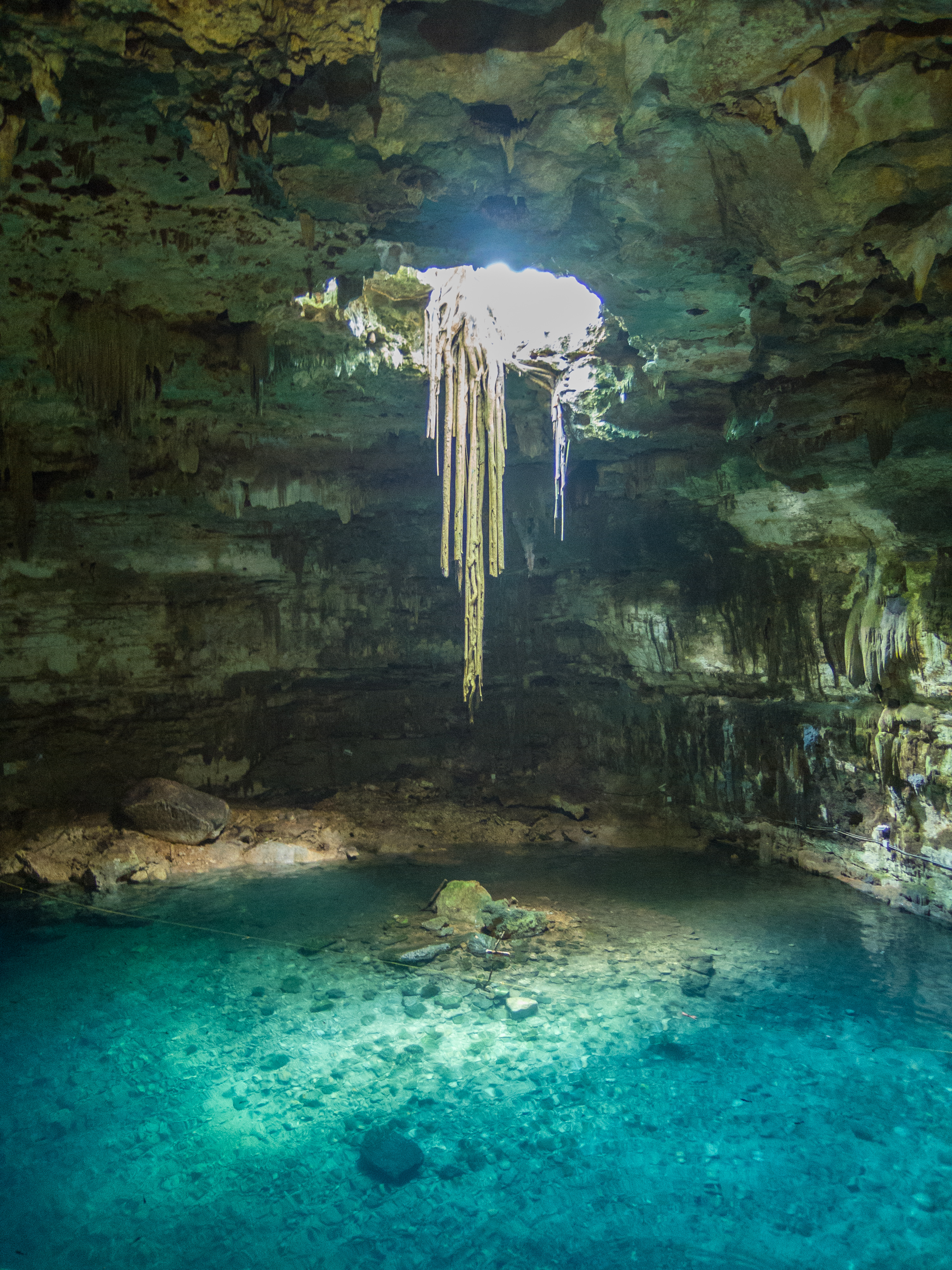
The Samulá Cenote in Valladolid, Yucatán, Mexico

Cenotes are formed by the dissolution of rock and the resulting subsurface void, which may or may not be linked to an active cave system, and the subsequent structural collapse. The rock that falls into the water below continues to dissolve, creating space for more blocks to collapse. Likely, the rate of collapse increases during periods when the water table is below the ceiling of the void since the rock ceiling is no longer buoyantly supported by the water in the void.

Cenotes may be fully collapsed, forming an open-water pool, or partially collapsed, with a portion of a rock overhanging the water. The stereotypical cenotes often resemble small circular ponds, measuring some tens of meters in diameter with sheer rock walls. Most cenotes, however, require some stooping or crawling to reach the water.

=== Penetration and extent ===
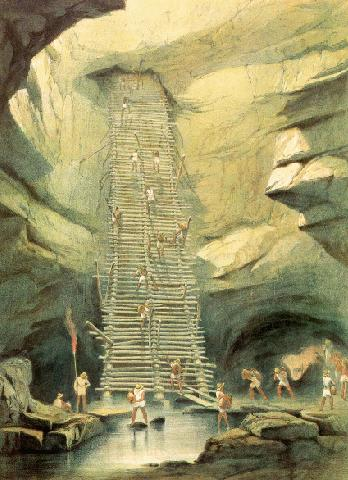
Cenote at Bolonchén, Mexico, used as a source of water, painting of 1842 by Frederick Catherwood

In the north and northwest of the Yucatán Peninsula, cenotes generally overlie vertical voids that penetrate 50 to 100 m (160 to 330 ft) below the modern water table. However, very few of these cenotes appear to be connected with horizontally extensive underground river systems, with water flow through them being more likely dominated by aquifer matrix and fracture flows.

In contrast, the cenotes along the Caribbean coast of the Yucatán Peninsula (within the state of Quintana Roo) often provide access to extensive underwater cave systems, such as Sistema Ox Bel Ha, Sistema Sac Actun/Sistema Nohoch Nah Chich and Sistema Dos Ojos.

=== Freshwater/seawater interface ===
The Yucatán Peninsula contains a vast coastal aquifer system, which is typically density-stratified. The infiltrating meteoric water (i.e., rainwater) floats on top of higher-density saline water intruding from the coastal margins. The whole aquifer is therefore an anchialine system (one that is land-locked but connected to an ocean). Where a cenote, or the flooded cave to which it is an opening, provides deep enough access into the aquifer, the interface between the fresh and saline water may be reached. The density interface between the fresh and saline waters is a halocline, which means a sharp change in salt concentration over a slight change in depth. Mixing fresh and saline water results in a blurry, swirling effect due to refraction caused by their different densities.

The depth of the halocline is a function of several factors: climate and specifically how much meteoric water recharges the aquifer, hydraulic conductivity of the host rock, distribution and connectivity of existing cave systems, and how effective these are at draining water to the coast, and the distance from the coast. In general, the halocline is deeper further from the shore. In the Yucatán Peninsula this depth is 10 to 20 m (33 to 66 ft) below the water table at the coast, and 50 to 100 m (160 to 330 ft) below the water table in the middle of the peninsula, with saline water underlying the whole of the peninsula.

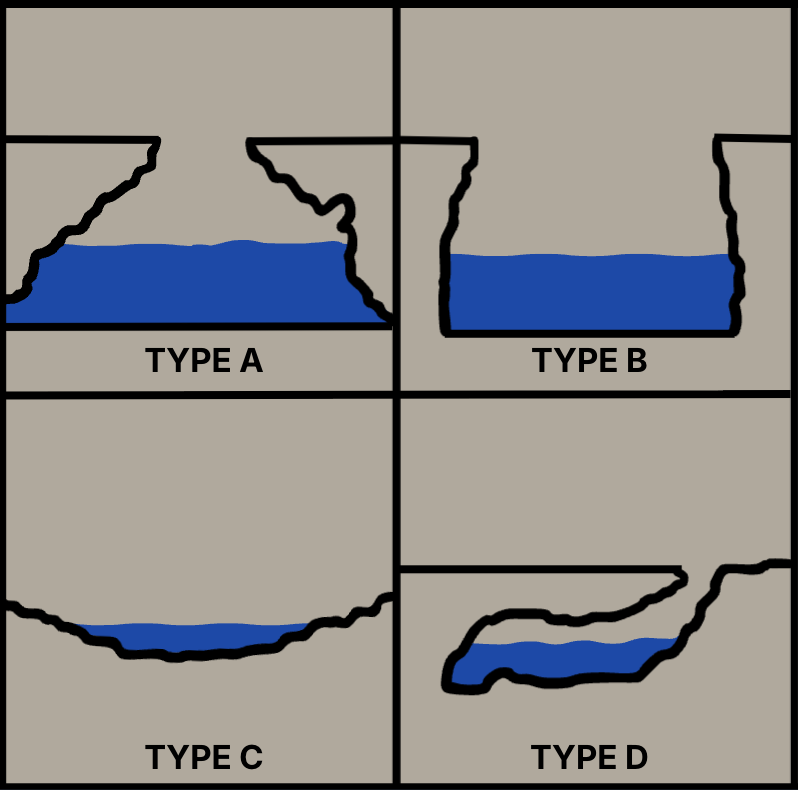
Types of Cenote Classifications

=== Types ===
There is currently no formal classification of cenote types. However, classifications from Frank Hall in 1936 have been used over the years as a starting point. Even though there may be intermediate types of cenote classifications, the majority can be placed within these four main types:

- Type A (Jug-shaped): A cenote with a narrow surface opening that widens at lower depths
- Type B (Vertical Walled): An open-air cenote with a nearly completely vertical drop around the edges
- Type C (Aguada-like): A shallow water basin or aguada with signs of rock breakdown from prior cenote formation
- Type D (Cave-like): A cave-like entrance that leads to a cenote

Type A and type B cenotes are more frequently found more inland in the Yucatan Peninsula while type D cenotes are more frequent in Quintana Roo. Type C cenotes can sometimes be connected to underlying aquifer systems such as the underground flooded cave system Ox Bel Ha. Type D cenotes are popular sites of tourism given their accessibility for tourists to explore and swim in them.

== Flora and fauna ==
=== Aquatic fauna ===
Flora and fauna are generally scarcer than in the open ocean; however, marine animals do thrive in caves. In caverns, one can spot mojarras, mollies, guppies, catfish, small eels and frogs. In the most secluded and darkest cenotes, the fauna has evolved to resemble that of many cave-dwelling species. For example, many animals lack pigmentation and are often blind, so they are equipped with long feelers to find food and navigate in the dark.

=== Bats ===
Cenotes support high levels of bat diversity. Bat activity, especially foraging, is more frequently identified around cenotes. Bats are also more active in landscapes with cenotes than landscapes without cenotes. Some bat species depend heavily on cenotes. For example, Pteronotus personatus has been recorded only in cenotes habitat. A possible explanation is that cenotes provide irreplaceable resources, including foraging areas, freshwater sources, and sheltered flight corridors. Vegetation surrounding cenotes also support diverse insect populations that serve as prey for insectivorous bats. This is especially important in Yucatán Peninsula, fresh water is only sourced in cenotes, making it a crucial substitute for rivers and streams.

Bats are essential pollinators in the Yucatán peninsula and for the species of plants that live in cenotes. Bats are mostly nocturnal and do almost all of their foraging and pollinating at night. This helps support the biodiversity of local plants who often bloom exclusively at night and not during the day. Bats are also important to pollinating species of plants that live in and around the forests of cenotes, for example the ceiba tree. Studies have shown that bats can carry pollen grains of this species and others kilometers away, helping to increase the biodiversity of plants that rely on cenotes.

== Chicxulub crater ==
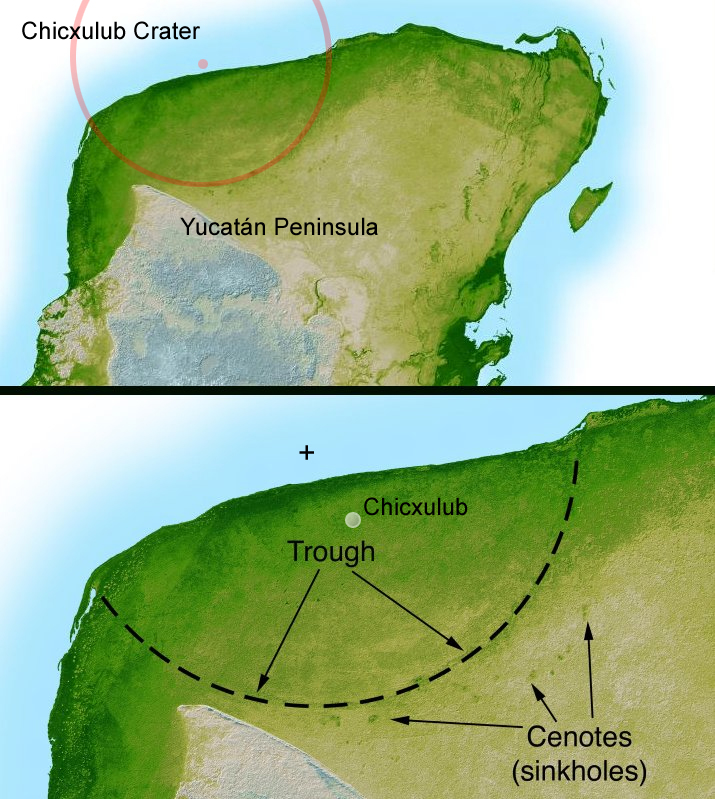
Radar topography reveals the 180 km (110 mi) ring of the crater; clustered around the crater's trough are numerous sinkholes, suggesting a prehistoric oceanic basin in the depression left by the impact (Image courtesy NASA/JPL-Caltech).

Although cenotes are found widely throughout much of the Yucatán Peninsula, a higher-density circular alignment of cenotes overlies the measured rim of the Chicxulub crater. This crater structure, identified from the alignment of cenotes, but also subsequently mapped using geophysical methods (including gravity mapping) and also drilled into with core recovery, has been dated to the boundary between the Cretaceous and Paleogene geologic periods, 66 million years ago. This meteorite impact at the Cretaceous–Paleogene boundary is therefore associated with the mass extinction of the non-avian dinosaurs and is also known as the Cretaceous–Paleogene extinction event.

There are also a larger amount of cenotes on the eastern side that are much more randomly scattered about when compared to the southern and western side. This is due to the greater fractures and more permeable limestone that are found on the eastern side.

== Archaeology and anthropology ==
During expeditions in 2001–2002 led by Arturo H. González and Carmen Rojas Sandoval in the Yucatán, three human skeletons were discovered; one of them, Eve of Naharon, was carbon-dated to 13,600 years old. In March 2008, three members of the Proyecto Espeleológico de Tulum and Global Underwater Explorers dive team, Alex Alvarez, Franco Attolini, and Alberto Nava, explored a section of Sistema Aktun Hu (part of Sistema Sac Actun) known as the pit Hoyo Negro. At a depth of 57 m (187 ft) the divers located the remains of a mastodon and a human skull (at 43 m [141 ft]) that might be the oldest evidence of human habitation in the region.

The Yucatán Peninsula has almost no rivers and only a few lakes, and those are often marshy. The widely distributed cenotes are the only perennial source of potable water and have long been the principal source of water in much of the region. Major Maya settlements required access to adequate water supplies, and therefore cities, including the famous Chichen Itza, were built around these natural wells. Many cenotes, like the Sacred Cenote at Chichén Itzá, played an important role in Maya rites. The Maya believed that cenotes were portals to Xibalba or the afterlife, and home to the rain god, Chaac. The Maya often deposited human remains as well as ceremonial artifacts in these cenotes.

The discovery of golden sacrificial artifacts in some cenotes led to the archaeological exploration of most cenotes in the first part of the 20th century. Edward Herbert Thompson (1857–1935), an American diplomat who had bought the Chichen Itza site, began dredging the Sacred Cenote there in 1904. He discovered human skeletons and sacrificial objects confirming a local legend, the Cult of the Cenote, involving human sacrifice to the rain god Chaac by the ritual casting of victims and objects into the cenote. However, not all cenotes were sites of human sacrifice. The cenote at Punta Laguna has been extensively studied, and none of the approximately 120 individuals show signs of sacrifice. The remains of this cultural heritage are protected by the UNESCO Convention on the Protection of the Underwater Cultural Heritage.

== Scuba diving ==
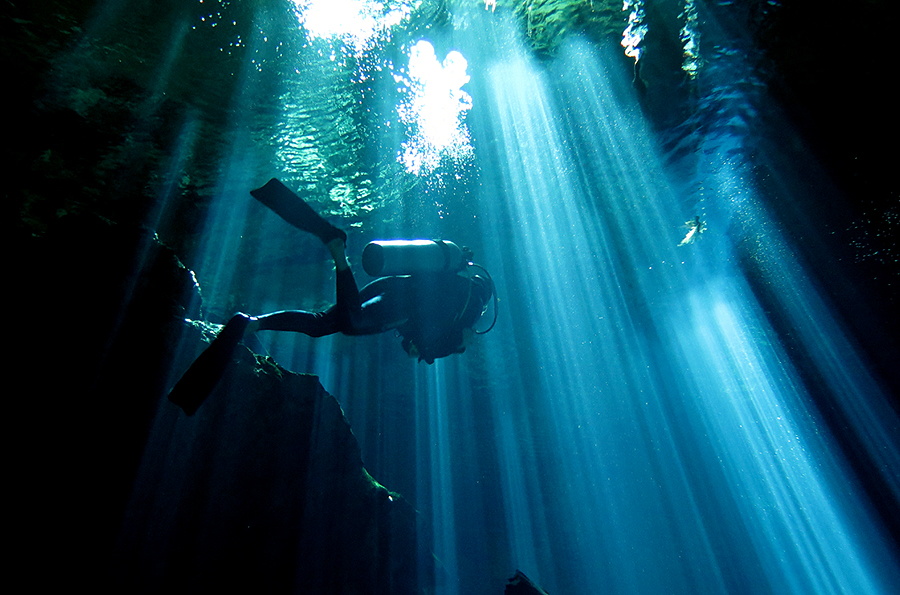
Scuba diving in a cenote

Cenotes have attracted cavern and cave divers, and there are organized efforts to explore and map these underwater systems. They are public or private and sometimes considered "National Natural Parks". Great care should be taken to avoid spoiling this fragile ecosystem when diving. In Mexico, the Quintana Roo Speleological Survey maintains a list of the longest and deepest water-filled and dry caves within the state boundaries. When cavern diving, one must be able to see natural light the entire time that one is exploring the cavern (e.g., Kukulkan cenote near Tulum, Mexico). During a cave dive, one passes the point where daylight can penetrate, and one follows a safety guideline to exit the cave. Things change quite dramatically once moving from a cavern dive to a cave dive.

Contrary to cenote cavern diving, cenote cave diving requires special equipment and training (certification for cave diving). However, both cavern and cave diving require detailed briefings, diving experience, and weight adjustment to freshwater buoyancy. The cenotes are usually filled with rather cool fresh water. Cenote divers must be wary of possible halocline; this produces blurred vision until they reach a more homogeneous area.

== Human impact ==
Tourism and deforestation are currently threatening cenotes ecosystems. Tourism at cenotes has developed rapidly in place like Yucatán Peninsula. Recreational activities, including swimming, scuba diving, and sightseeing, have brought frequent human visitation. Increased human disruption has caused multiple problems including noise and artificial light that disturbs cenotes-roosting animals. Noise may interfere with navigation and resting behavior of animals roosting at cenotes, while artificial light may alter their activity's patterns. Frequent human visitation may also disturb roosting animals, causing them to spend more energy avoiding humans. Furthermore, Habitat fragmentation has a greater impact on mobile animals like bats. The artificial change of natural environment has been shown to reduce biodiversity. It is crucial to protect the cenote habitat and the surrounding vegetation to protect native species.

== Notable cenotes ==
=== Australia ===
- Ewens Ponds, near Mount Gambier, South Australia
- Kilsby sinkhole, near Mount Gambier, South Australia
- Little Blue Lake, near Mount Schank, South Australia

=== Bahamas ===
- Thunderball Grotto, on Staniel Cay

=== Canada ===
- Devil's Bath

=== Dominican Republic ===
- Hoyo Azul (Punta Cana)
- Los Tres Ojos
- Ojos Indigenas (Punta Cana)

=== Greece ===
- Melissani Cave, Kefalonia

=== Mexico ===
- Cenote Azul, Playa del Carmen
- Choo-Ha, Coba
- Dos Ojos, Municipality of Tulum
- Dzibilchaltun, Yucatán
- Gran Cenote, Municipality of Tulum
- Hubiku, Yucatan
- Ik Kil, Yucatan
- Sacred Cenote, Chichen Itza
- Sistema Sac Actun, Tulum
- Sistema Dos Ojos, Quintana Roo (with 28 known cenotes)
- Sistema Nohoch Nah Chich, Quintana Roo (with 36 known cenotes)
- Sistema Ox Bel Ha, Quintana Roo (with more than 160 cenotes)
- Xtacunbilxunan, Bolonchén
- Zaci, Valladolid
- El Zapote, the site of the Hells Bells bell-like rock formation

=== United States ===
- Blue Hole, Santa Rosa, New Mexico
- Blue Hole, Castalia, Ohio
- Bottomless Lakes, near Roswell, New Mexico
- Montezuma Well, Verde Valley, Arizona
- Hamilton Pool, Austin, Texas

=== Zimbabwe ===
- Chinhoyi Caves in Zimbabwe

== See also ==
- Aquifer – Underground water-bearing rock
- Blue hole – Marine cavern or sinkhole, open to the surface, in carbonate bedrock
- Karst – Topography from dissolved soluble rocks
- Quintana Roo Speleological Survey – Data repository for explored sites within the state of Quintana Roo
- Saltwater intrusion – Movement of saline water into freshwater aquifers
- Sinkhole – Geologically-formed topological depression
  - List of sinkholes – Links to Wikipedia articles on sinkholes, blue holes, dolines, cenotes, and pit caves
