= Sistema Dos Ojos =

Flooded cave system in the Yucatan Peninsula, Mexico

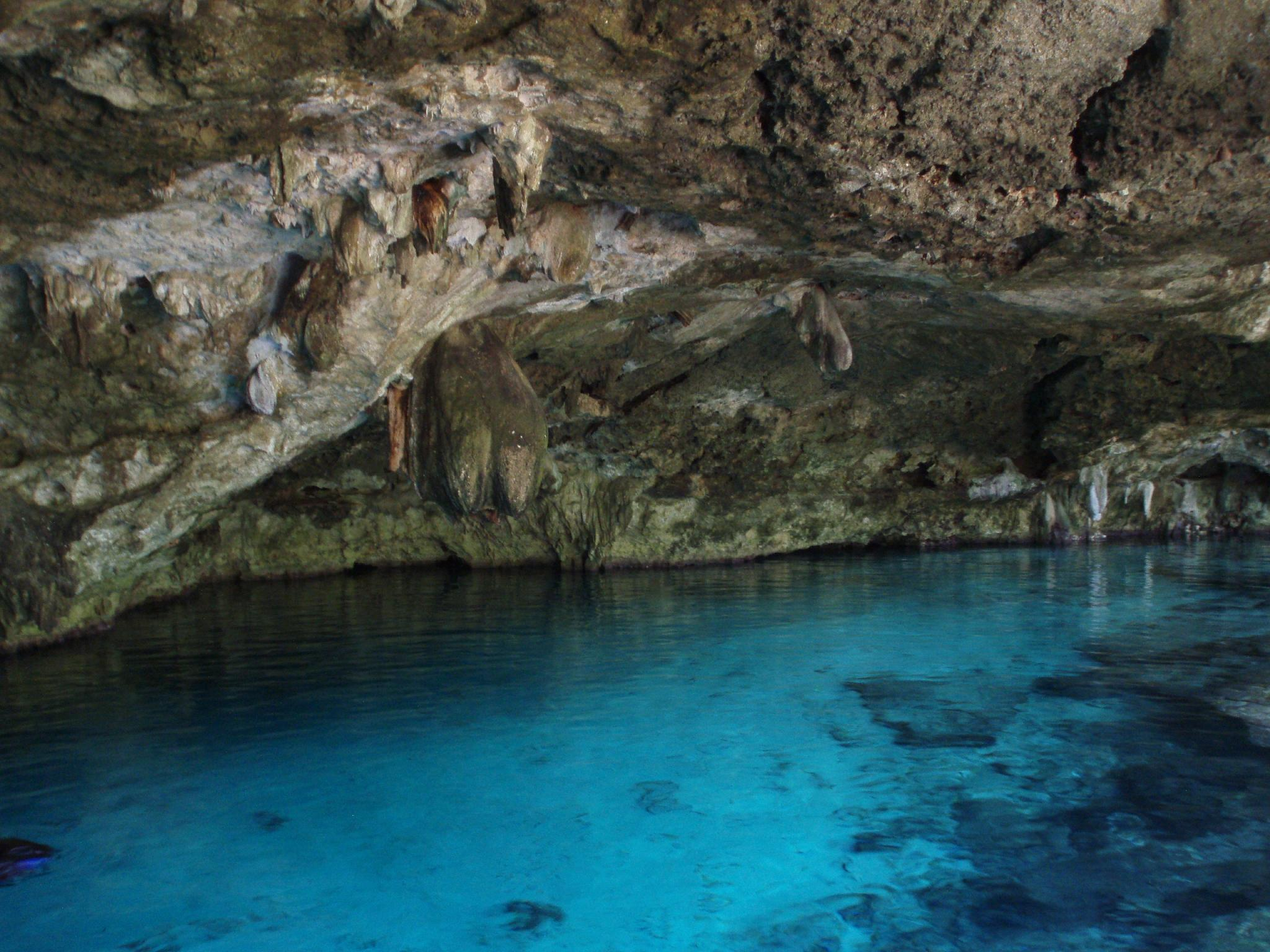

- Location within Mexico
- Location: Quintana Roo, Mexico
- Coordinates: 20°19′29″N 87°23′31″W
- Depth: 119.1 meters (391 ft)
- Length: 82.472 kilometers (51.246 mi)
- Discovery: November 1987
- Geology: Limestone
- Entrances: 28 cenotes
- Difficulty: Advanced cave diving

Dos Ojos (officially Spanish: Sistema Dos Ojos, lit. 'Two Eyes System') is part of a flooded cave system located north of Tulum, on the Caribbean coast of the Yucatán Peninsula, in the state of Quintana Roo, Mexico. The exploration of Dos Ojos began in 1987 and still continues. The surveyed extent of the cave system is 82 kilometers (51 mi) and there are 28 known sinkhole entrances, which are locally called cenotes. In January 2018, a connection was found between Sistema Dos Ojos and Sistema Sac Actun. The smaller Dos Ojos became a part of Sac Actun, making the Sistema Sac Actun the longest known underwater cave system in the world.

Dos Ojos lies north of the rest of the Sac Actun cave system. As a separate system, Dos Ojos remained in the top ten, if not the top three, longest underwater cave systems in the world since the late 1980s. Dos Ojos contains the deepest known cave passage in Quintana Roo with 119.1 meters (391 ft) of depth located at "The Pit" discovered in 1996 by cave explorers who came all the way from the main entrance some 1,500 meters (4,900 ft) away. The deep passages include the "Wakulla Room", the "Beyond Main Base (BMB) passage", "Jill's room" and "The Next Generation passage". In August 2012 Dos Ojos was connected through a dry passage to Sistema Sac Actun. With March 2014 the total length of the combined system measures 319.05 kilometers (198.25 mi).

Dos Ojos is an anchialine cave system with connections to naturally intruding marine water and tidal influence in the cenotes. The coastal discharge point(s) of this cave system have not yet been humanly explored through to the ocean, although large volumes of groundwater were demonstrated by dye tracing to flow towards Caleta Xel-Ha, a nearby coastal bedrock lagoon.

The name Dos Ojos refers to two neighbouring cenotes that connect into a very large cavern zone shared between the two. These two cenotes appear like two large eyes into the underground. The original cave diving exploration of the whole cave system began through these cenotes. The Dos Ojos underwater cave system was featured in a 2002 IMAX film, Journey Into Amazing Caves, and the 2006 BBC/Discovery Channel series Planet Earth. Parts of the Hollywood 2005 movie The Cave were filmed in the Dos Ojos cave system.

Water temperature is 25 °C or 77 °F throughout the year, and the maximum depth near the Dos Ojos cenotes is approximately 10 meters (33 ft). The water is exceptionally clear as a result of rainwater filtered through limestone, and there being very little soil development in this region since the limestone is very pure.

== Fauna ==
There are several varieties of fish living in the cavern, the majority of which are well under 10 centimeters (3.9 in) long, and at least two types of freshwater shrimp.

== Tourism ==
The Dos Ojos Cenotes are a popular snorkeling and cavern diving site receiving typically a hundred or more tourists per day. The majority of cavern dives are at 5–7 meters (16–23 ft). Most guided cavern dives include two dives in one day, each being 45 minutes long plus a 60-minute surface interval. It is possible to traverse underwater into another adjacent cenote called the "Bat Cave", which is also used for snorkeling. Visibility is excellent and generally limited by available light rather than water transparency.

== Freediving Record ==
On November 3, 2010, Dos Ojos hosted Carlos Coste's record-breaking freedive. Coste swam 150 m (490 ft) on one breath and became the Guinness World Record holder for "Longest distance swam underwater with one breath (open water)".

== See also ==
- List of caves
- List of caves in Mexico
- List of sinkholes of Mexico – Links to Wikipedia articles on sinkholes, blue holes, dolines, cenotes, and pit caves
- Speleology – Science of cave and karst systems
