= Punta Laguna =

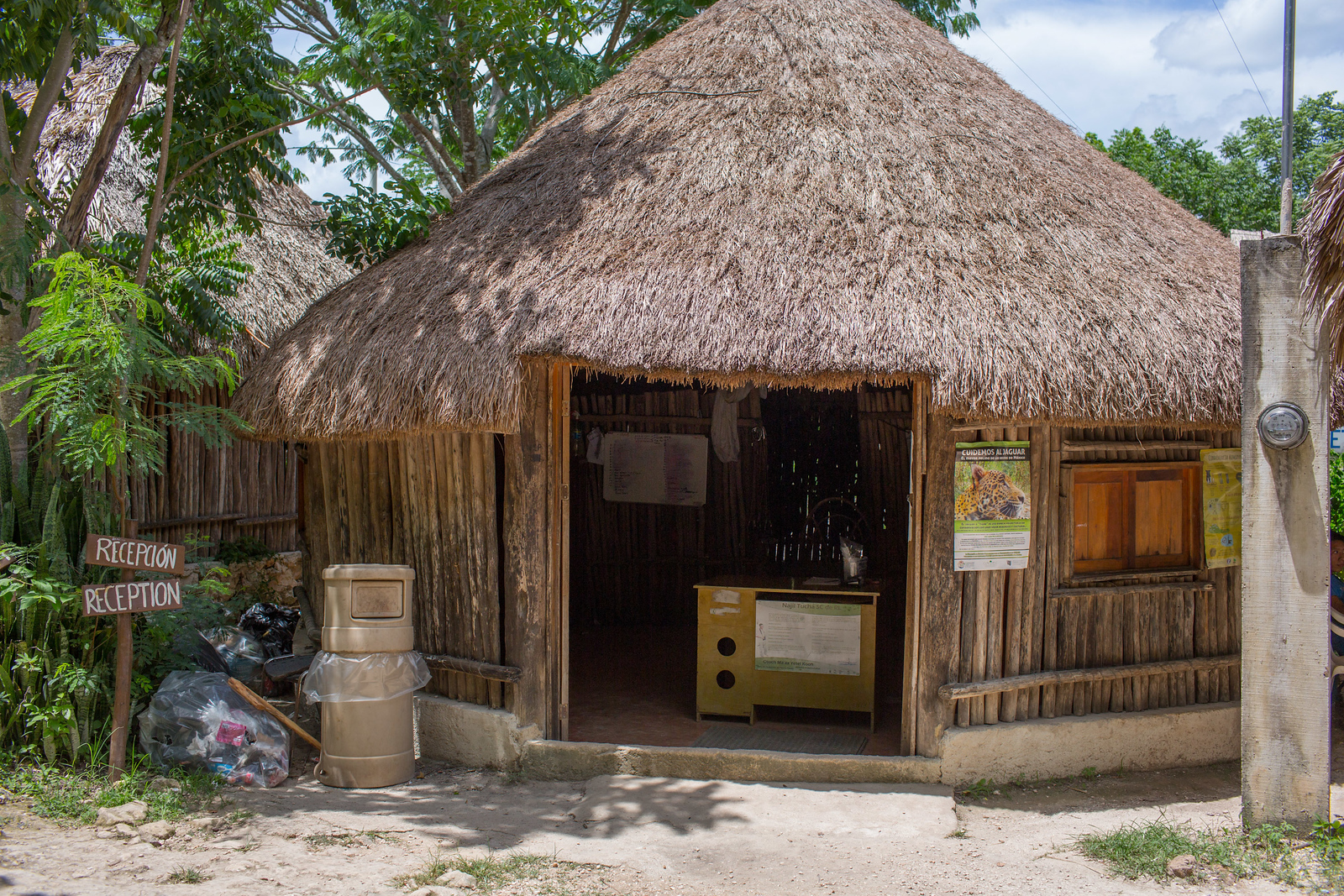
Entrance to the nature reserve at Punta Laguna

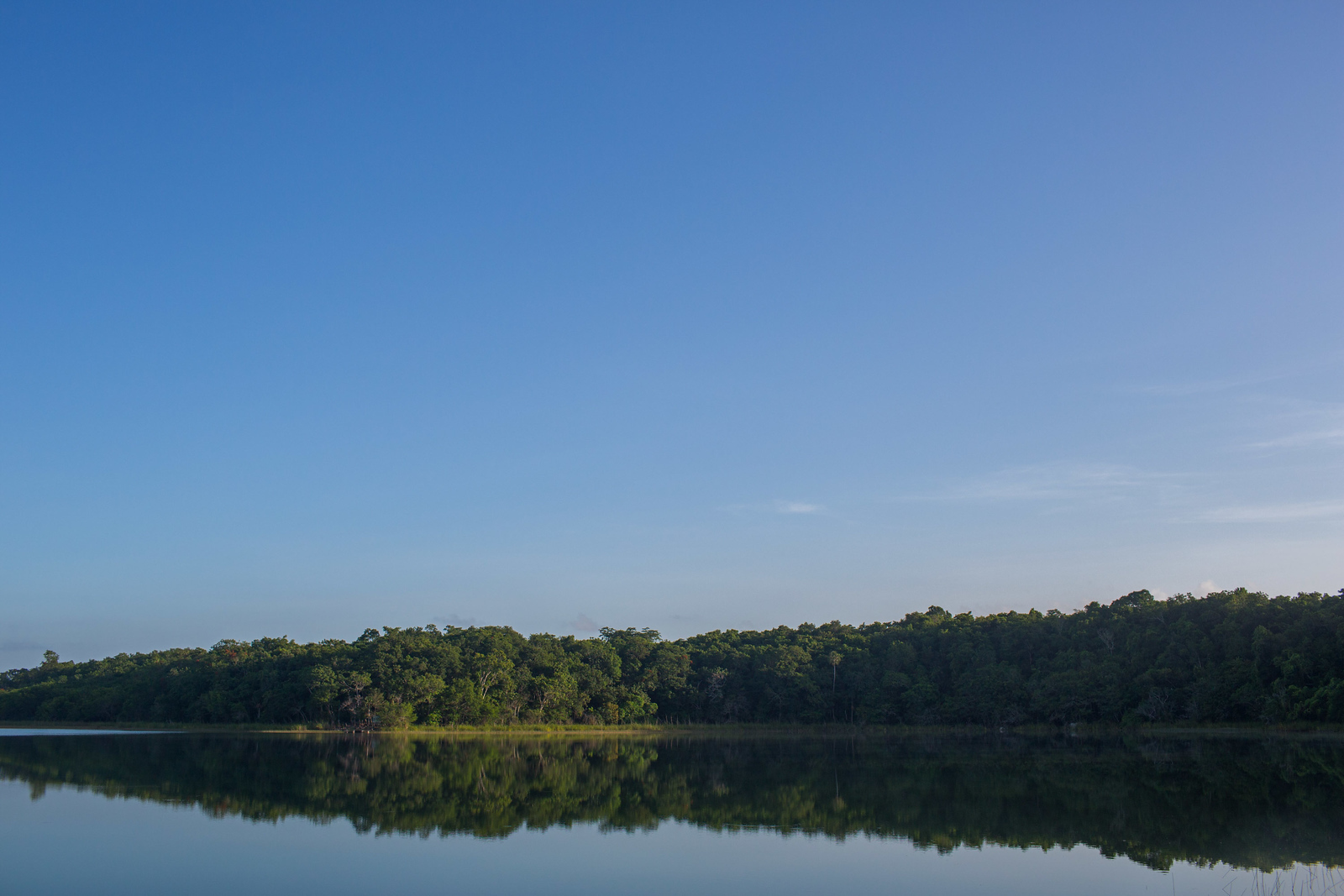
A view of the Punta Laguna Lagoon in 2017

Punta Laguna is a town along the borders of the Mexican states of Quintana Roo and Yucatan. Punta Laguna is home to the Najil Tucha community cooperative, which operates tours of the adjacent Otoch Ma'ax Yetel Kooh nature preserve, home to spider monkeys and howler monkeys. The reserve has been the site of scientific studies in the fields of geology, primatology, and archaeology.

== Archaeological site ==
The archaeological site of Punta Laguna was occupied from approximately 300 BCE to 1500 CE, spanning the Preclassic, Classic, and Postclassic Periods. The site consists of over 200 structures located around the Punta Laguna lagoon. The site also includes a cenote containing the remains of at least 120 individuals who were ritually deposited there over the course of the site's occupation.
