= Quintana Roo Speleological Survey =

Data repository for explored sites within the state of Quintana Roo

The Quintana Roo Speleological Survey (QRSS) was established in 1990 for the safe exploration, survey and cartography of the underwater and dry caves and cenotes of Quintana Roo, Mexico, supported by the National Speleological Society.

The survey principally acts as a data repository for explored sites within the state of Quintana Roo and distributes summary statistical tables through its webpage, which as of January, 2025 included 412 underwater cave systems with a total surveyed length of 1,736.7 kilometers (1,079.1 mi), and 153 caves above the water table with a total length of 359.7 kilometers (223.5 mi).

The geographical area for the data archived in the QRSS is essentially the whole of the state of Quintana Roo, which extends along the Caribbean coast of the Yucatán Peninsula, from Cancun and south to the capital of Chetumal situated on the border with Belize. The explosive urban and tourism based development within the Riviera Maya and the Costa Maya is leading to increasing and widespread environmental stresses. The documentation of the flooded and dry cave networks and cenotes provided by the QRSS is of fundamental importance in regional and site specific scale planning and management of development, water resources, waste disposal facilities, hazardous material handling site selection, and so forth. Certified cave divers may obtain an information package on underwater survey and cartography opportunities in Quintana Roo.

== See also ==
The two longest surveyed systems

- Sistema Ox Bel Ha – 496.8 kilometers (308.7 mi)
- Sistema Sac Actun and Sistema Dos Ojos – 379.6 kilometers (235.9 mi)
