= Molnár János Cave =

Water-filled cave in Budapest, Hungary

Coordinates: 47°31′4.37″N 19°2′9.22″E

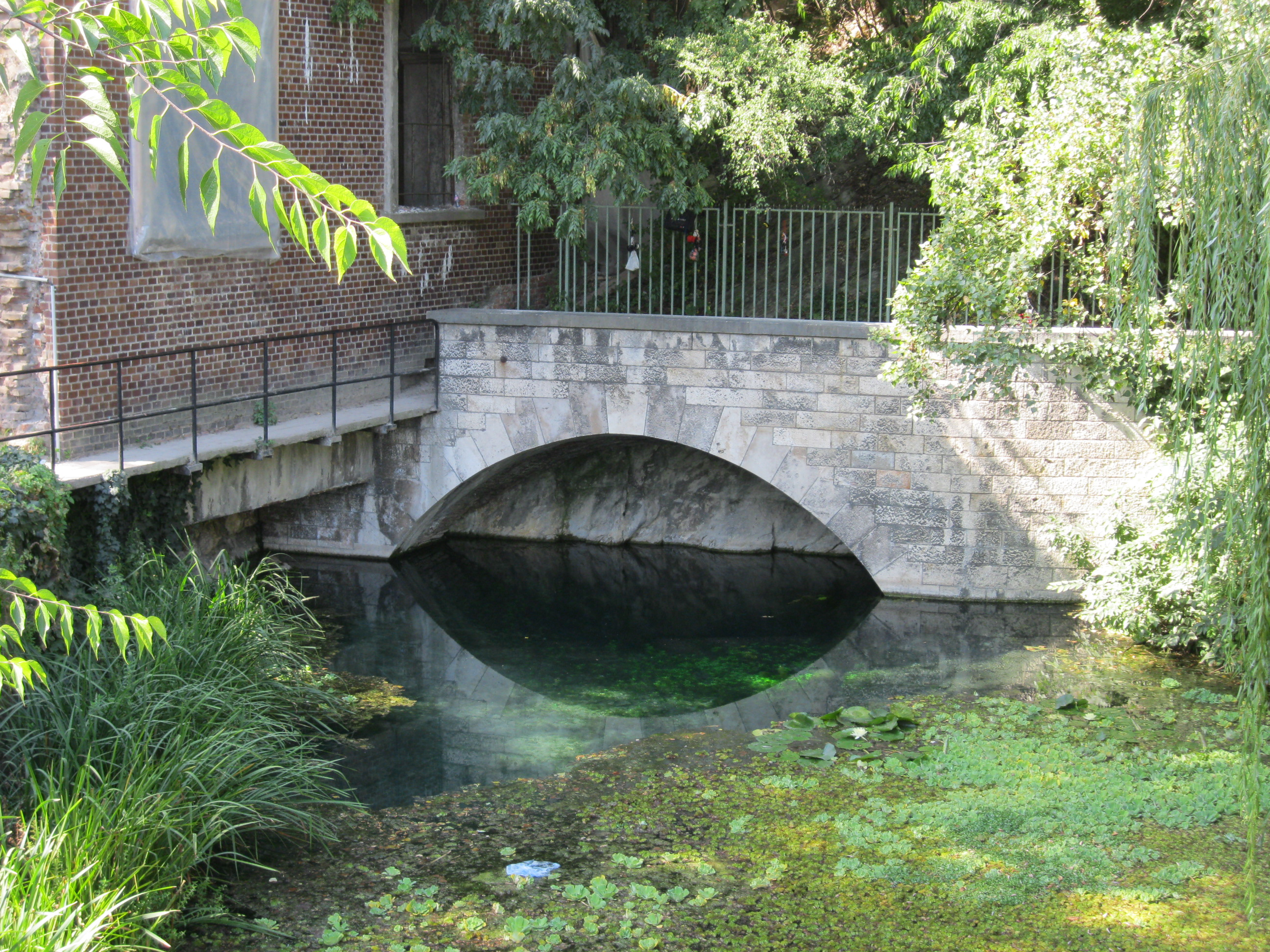
Cave entrance

The Molnár János Cave is a thermokarstic water-filled cave system. It is located in the Rózsadomb district of Budapest in Hungary.

The deepest sections reach 100 metres (330 ft). The explored passages totalled 5.5 kilometres (3.4 mi) in 2010; according to the cave's dive centre the system now extends to more than 6 kilometres (3.7 mi). The cave mouth is just 200 metres (660 ft) from the Danube.

In 2008, a cave lake was found there, with largest chamber roughly 86 metres (282 ft) long, 27 metres (89 ft) wide and 15 metres (49 ft) high.

== Description ==
The cave lies beside the artificial Malom Lake (Malom-tó), which is fed by its spring water and drains through a sluice and canal beneath the building of the Lukács Bath into the Danube. The dry part of the cave begins a few metres above the surface of the lake.

It is an active hypogenic cave, formed by mixing corrosion below the water table where flow systems of different chemistry and temperature meet along tectonic lines. Its maze of passages follows the dip of the Upper Eocene limestone and marl. The fauna includes three species of the amphipod genus Niphargus, as well as an isopod and a snail.

== History ==
The cave is named after János Molnár, a 19th-century pharmacist who investigated its dry passages, analysed the spring water and believed that a water-filled cave system lay beneath the hill. Underwater exploration began in the 1950s. In the 1970s and 1980s divers of the FTSK Delfin club explored and surveyed more than 400 metres (1,300 ft) of passages; in 2002 they found a new passage that led to much larger sections of the cave.

== Protection and access ==
The cave has been protected since 1982. Under Hungarian decree 17/2021 (IV. 9.) AM it is one of the caves open to non-research cave diving, for at most 50 people a day, in the operating area of the Duna–Ipoly National Park Directorate. The thermal karst system of the Rózsadomb area, in which the cave lies, has been on Hungary's World Heritage tentative list since 1993 as the "Caves of the Buda Thermal Karst System".
