= Akumal =

Community in Quintana Roo state, Mexico

- Community
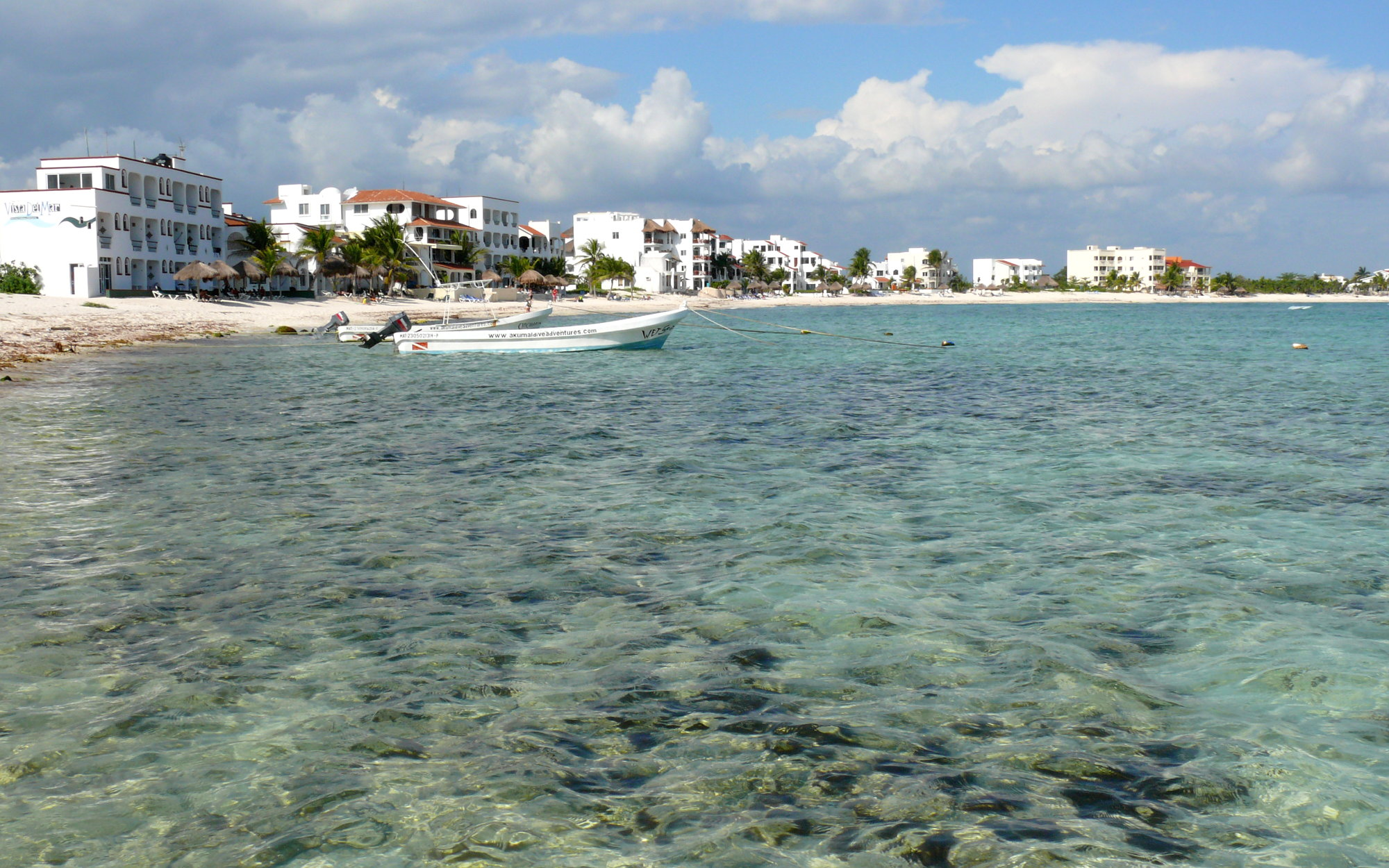
- Half-moon Bay in Akumal

- Location on the Yucatán Peninsula in Mexico
- Coordinates: 20°24′00″N 87°19′16″W
- Country: Mexico
- State: Quintana Roo
- Municipality: Tulum
- Founded: 1958
- Elevation: 36 ft (11 m)

Population (2020)
  - Total: 2,154
- Time zone: UTC-5 (EST)
- Major Airport: Cancún International Airport
- IATA Code: CUN
- ICAO Code: MMUN

Akumal is a small beachfront tourist resort community in Mexico, 100 km (62 mi) south of Cancún, between the towns of Playa del Carmen and Tulum. It is on Akumal Bay and Half Moon Bay on the site of a former coconut plantation in Tulum Municipality in the state of Quintana Roo, and is part of the Riviera Maya area. The 2010 census showed a population of 1,310.

Akumal is famous as a destination for snorkeling. Visitors can swim with endangered green sea turtles, which visit the bay to feed on sea grass. Snorkeling's popularity has put environmental pressure on the fragile habitat.

== History ==
Akumal was officially founded in 1958 as a community for scuba divers by Pablo Bush Romero—a Mexican businessman, big game trophy hunter, diver, writer, historian, and archaeologist. His family still controls a portion of Akumal.

On March 7, 2016, Akumal Bay was declared a marine refuge to protect the threatened turtle population.

In 2018 the Akumal Arts Festival was founded. Each November this event brings over 120 national and international artists from Mexico for one of the largest mural festivals being produced globally.

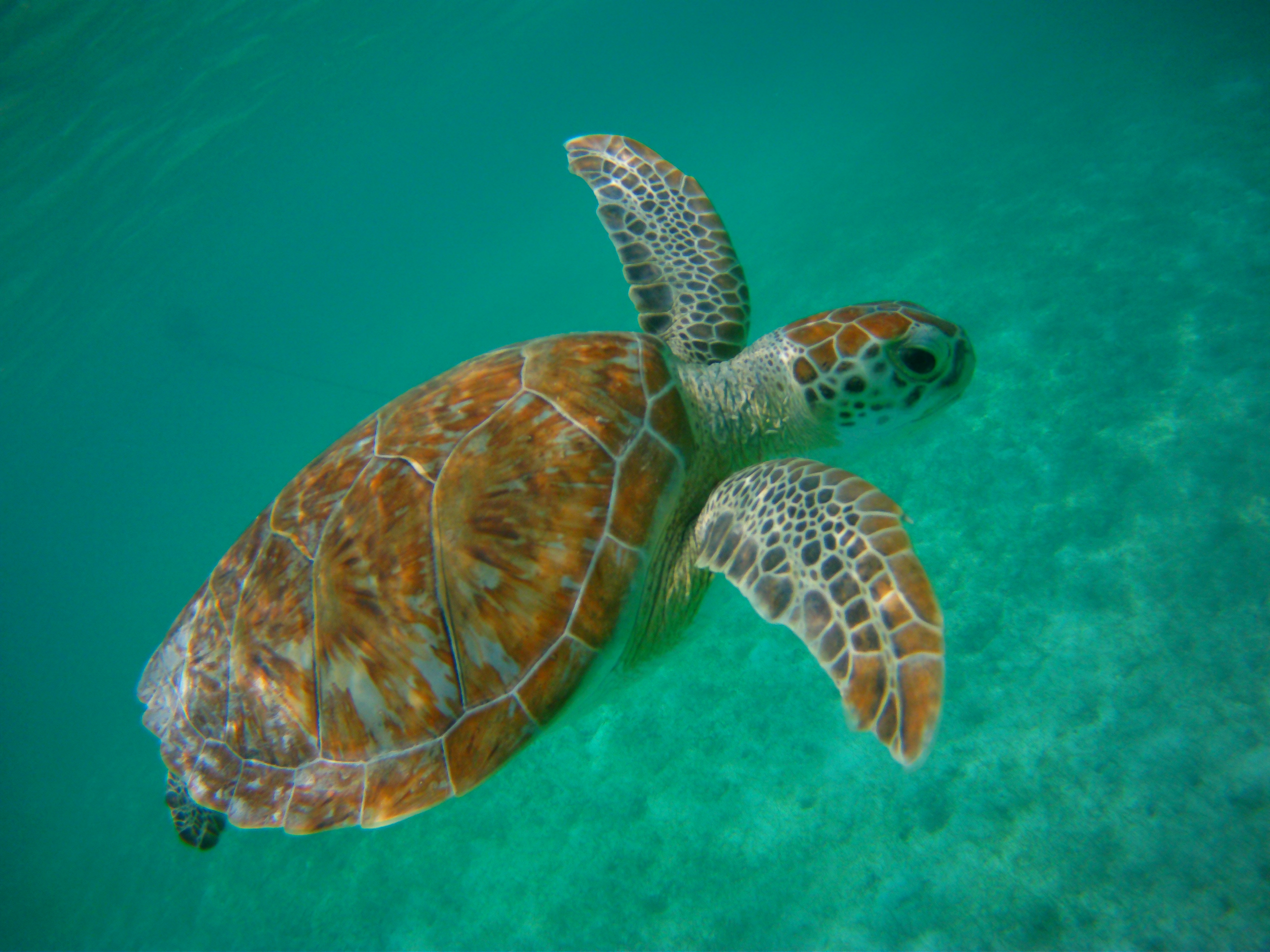
Green sea turtle (Chelonia mydas) swimming in Akumal
