= Sistema Ox Bel Ha =

Flooded cave system in Quintana Roo, Mexico

- Location within Mexico
- Location: Quintana Roo, Mexico
- Coordinates: 20°9′37″N 87°29′15″W
- Depth: 57.3 m (188 ft)
- Length: 541.7 km (336.6 mi)
- Discovery: February 1996
- Geology: Limestone
- Entrances: 160 Cenotes
- Difficulty: Advanced cave diving
- Cave survey: Grupo de Exploración Ox Bel Ha

The Sistema Ox Bel Ha (Spanish: sistema, lit. 'system', Yucatec Maya: ox bel ha, lit. 'Three Paths of Water'; short Ox Bel Ha) is a cave system in Quintana Roo, Mexico. It is the longest explored underwater cave in the world and ranks second including dry caves. As of February 2026 the surveyed length is 541.7 kilometers (336.6 mi) of underwater passages. There are more than 160 cenotes in the system.

== Discoveries ==
The Naranjal subsystem is part of Sistema Ox Bel Ha. Three prehistoric human remains have been found within the subsystem. The Jailhouse cenote, or Las Palmas, is the entrance to the locations of the Muknal and Las Palmas caves. The skeleton of an 18 to 20-year-old woman, Eve of Naharon, (13,454±117 cal BP) was discovered at a location around 368 m (1,207 ft) away from the Jailhouse cenote entrance. The skeleton of a 44 to 50-year-old woman, Las Palmas Lady (8,937±203 cal BP) was found at a location around 2 km (1.2 mi) away from the Jailhouse cenote entrance. The Muknal cave, part of the Naranjal subsystem, contained the remains of a 40 to 50-year-old man, the Muknal Grandfather (9,600 cal BP). Unlike the other two skeletons in the subsystem, the Muknal Grandfather shows evidence of secondary burial. Analysis of these skeletons suggests that Ox Bel Ha was likely used as an important site for ritual burial.

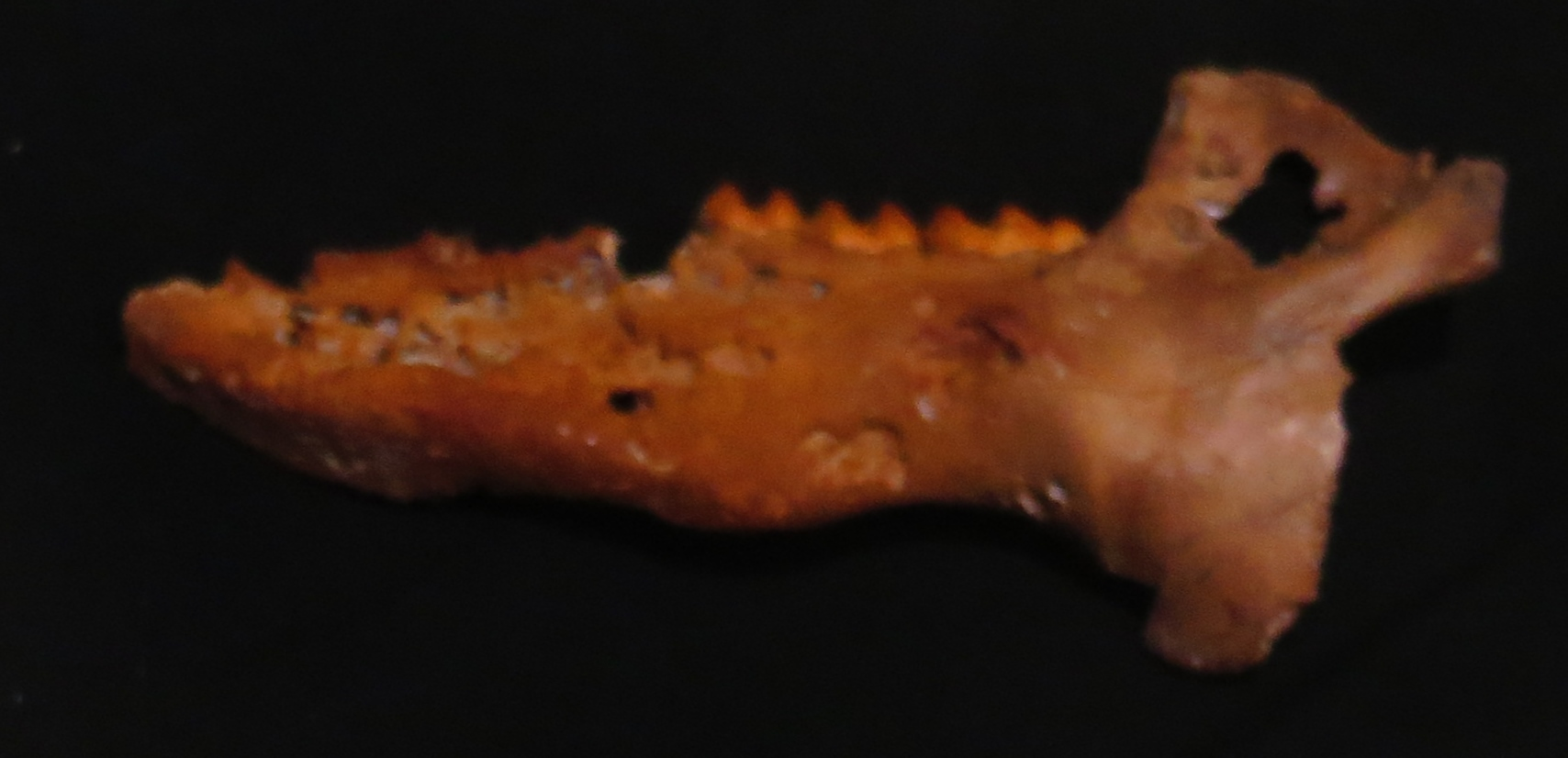
Muknalia minima mandible

A new genus and species of extinct peccary, Muknalia minima, was identified from a fossil mandible found in the Muknal cave of the Ox Bel Ha system. However, it was subsequently recognised that this was a junior synonym of the collared peccary.

== See also ==
- List of caves in Mexico
- List of longest caves
