= Tulum Municipality =

Tulum
- Municipality
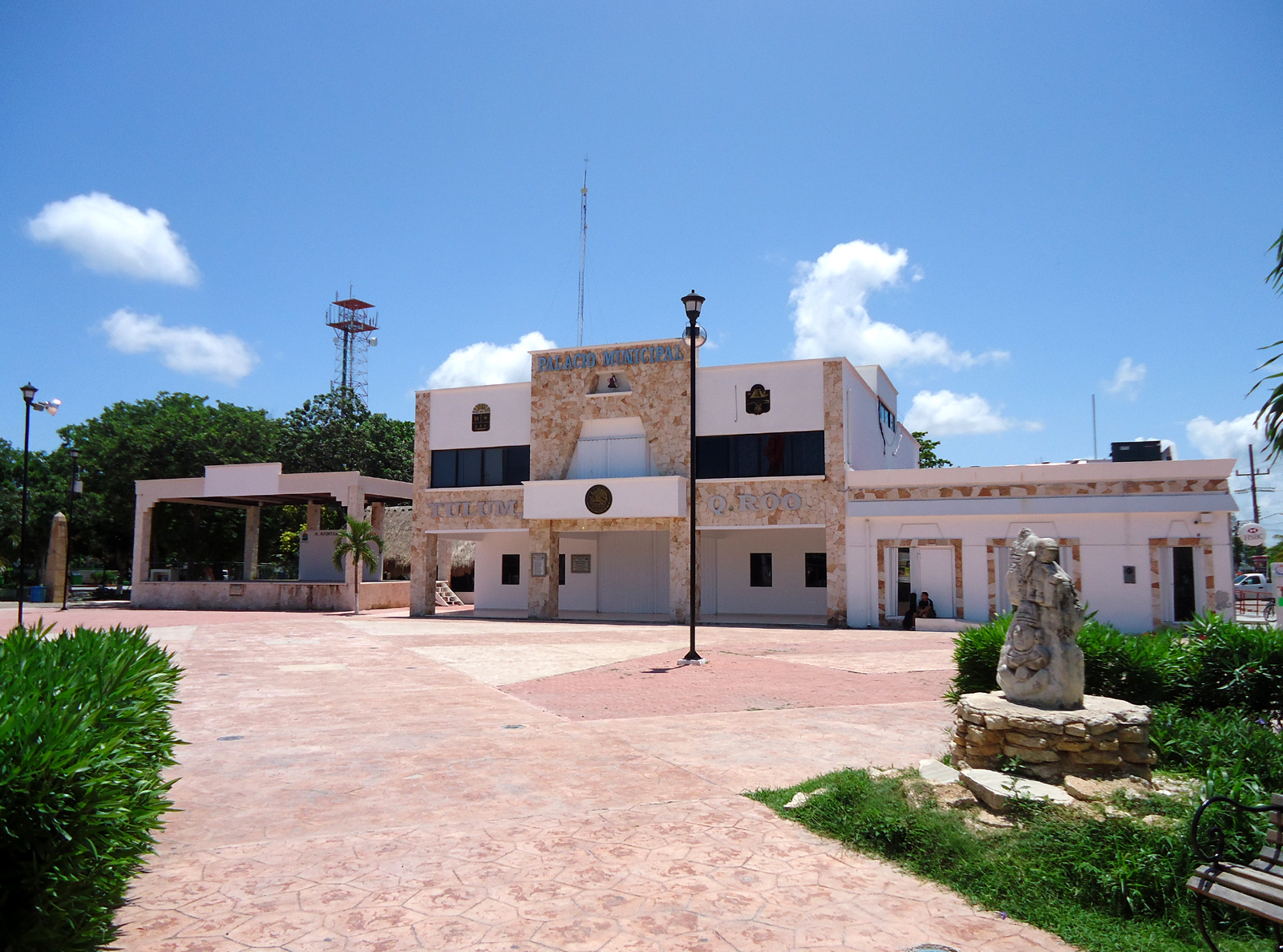
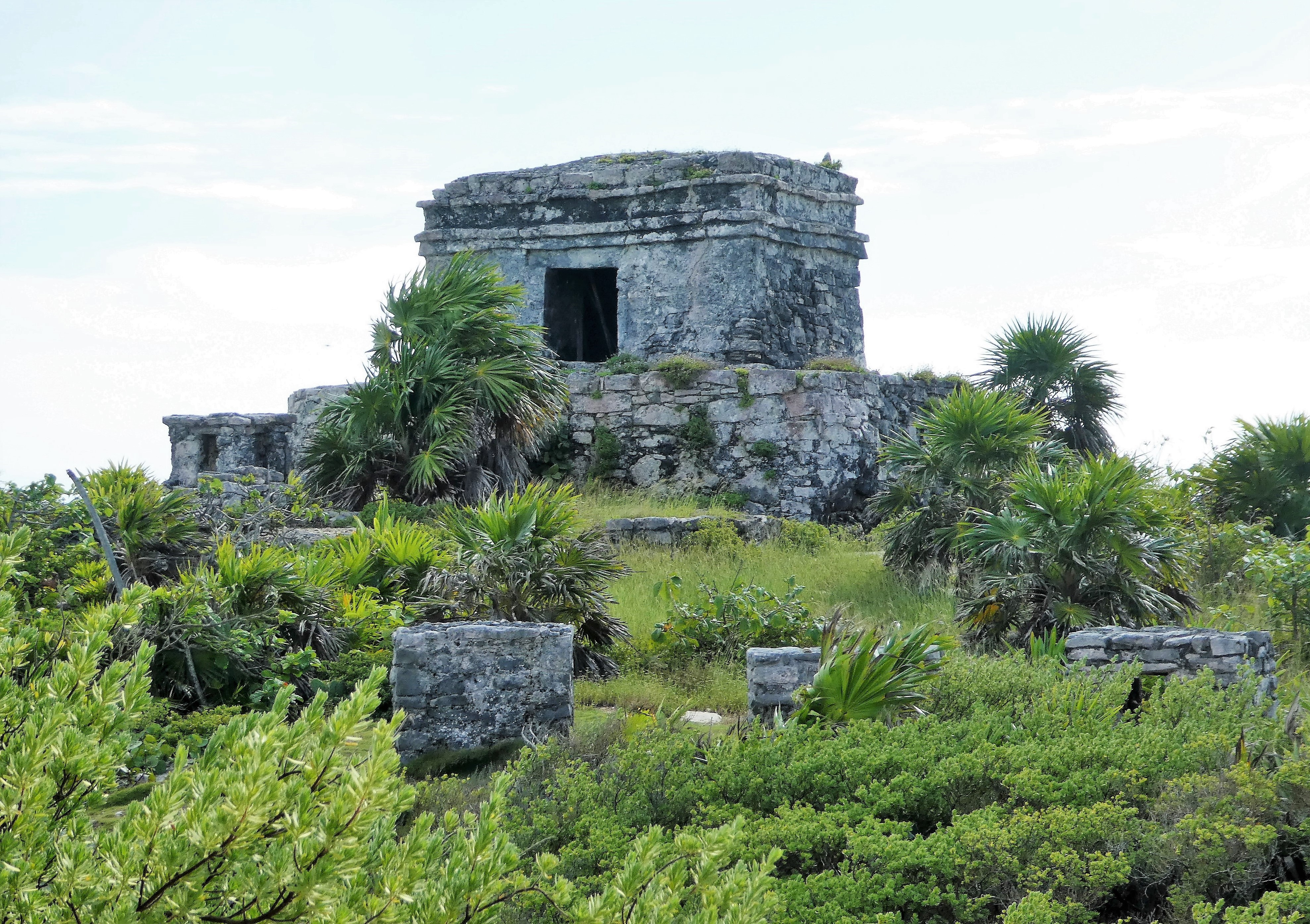
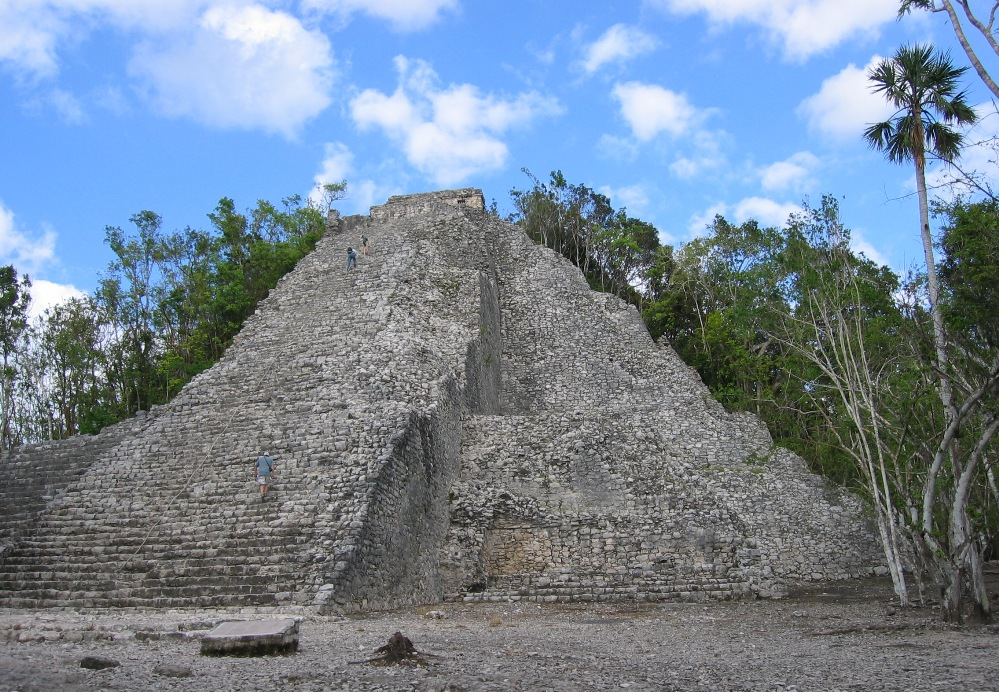
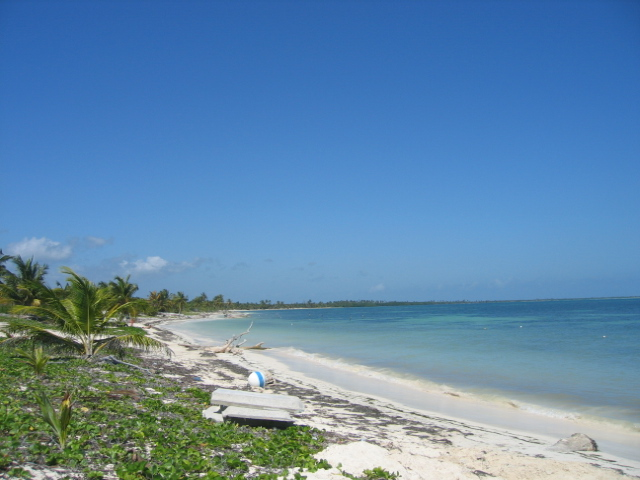
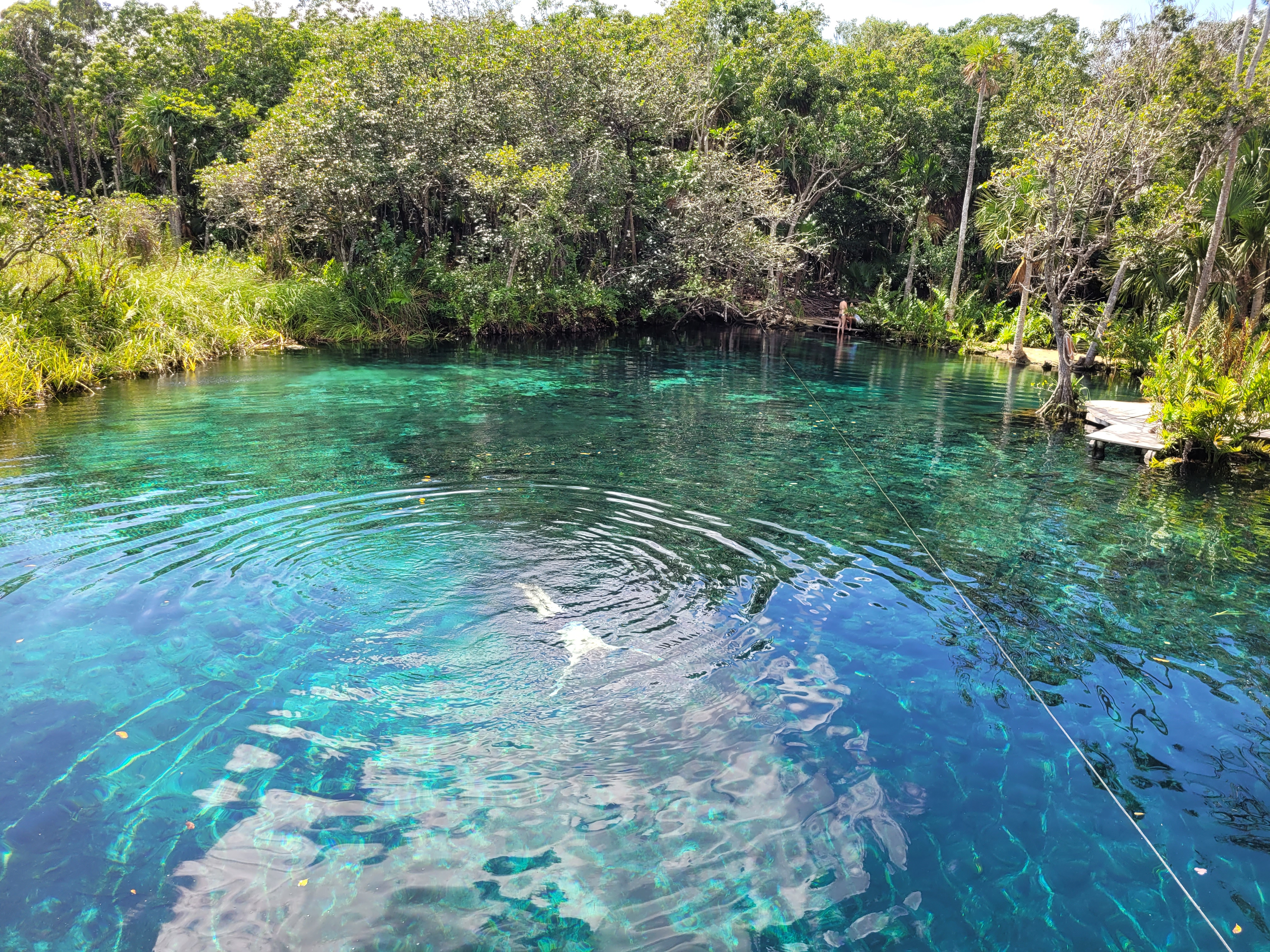
- Top: Tulum Municipal Hall; Middle: Tulum Archaeological Zone, Coba Archaeological Zone; Bottom: Punta Allen Beach, Corazón del Paraíso Cenote

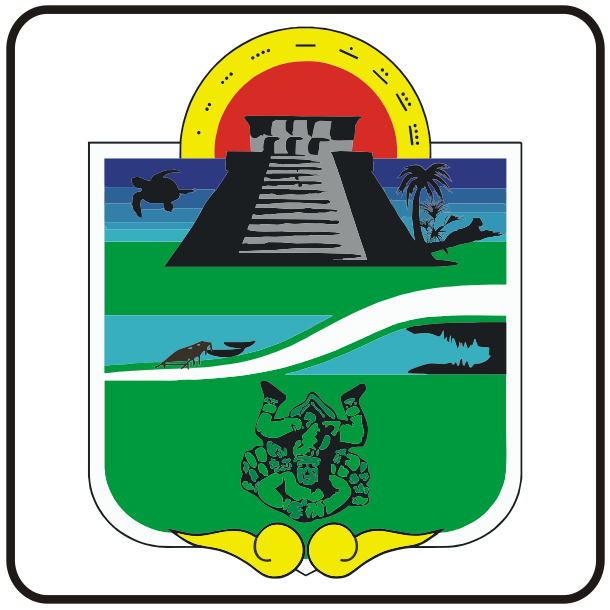
- Coat of arms

- Location of Tulum Municipality in Quintana Roo

- Location within Mexico
- Coordinates: 20°13′N 87°28′W
- Country: Mexico
- State: Quintana Roo
- Established: 19 May 2008
- Municipal seat: Tulum

Government
  - Municipal President: Diego Castañón Trejo (desde 2023) https://es.wikipedia.org/wiki/Anexo:Presidentes_municipales_de_Quintana_Roo_(2021-2024)

Area
  - Land: 2,040 km^{2} (790 sq mi)
- Elevation: 10 m (33 ft)

Population (2020)
  - Total: 46,721
  - Density: 13.9/km^{2} (36/sq mi)
- Time zone: UTC-5 (Eastern Time)
- INEGI Code: 23009
- Website: www.tulum.gob.mx

Tulum Municipality (Spanish: Municipio de Tulum, [muniˈsipjo ðe tuˈlum]) is one of the eleven municipalities that make up the Mexican state of Quintana Roo. It became a municipality when it was formed on 13 March 2008, at which time it was separated from Solidaridad Municipality.

Tulum is home to the Maya archaeological sites of Tulum and Cobá.

== Geography ==
The municipality of Tulum borders the municipalities of Solidaridad to the north and Felipe Carrillo Puerto to the south, in the state of Quintana Roo. It also borders Chemax Municipality and Valladolid Municipality in the state of Yucatán on the northwest, and the Caribbean Sea on the east.

=== Orography and hydrography ===
Like most of the Yucatan Peninsula Tulum is entirely flat with a gentle slope towards the sea, so from west to east, the area never reaches an altitude higher than 25 metres (82 ft) above sea level. The municipality is 5 metres (16 ft) above sea level on average.

Like the rest of the peninsula's surface the land has a limestone base that does not allow the formation of surface water flows such as rivers and streams; the water instead flows in underground rivers that sometimes rise to the surface in the cenotes. Lakes and cenotes are the major bodies of water in the municipality.

=== Communities ===
The municipality consists of 170 populated localities, plus an additional 224 unpopulated localities, and includes part of a biosphere reserve (Sian Ka'an, which lies mostly in neighboring Felipe Carrillo Puerto Municipality). The largest localities (cities, towns, and villages) are:

Name	Population (2020 census)
Tulum	33,374
Akumal	2,154
Cobá	1,738
Chanchen Primero	1,078
Francisco Hu May	1,288
San Juan	770
Macario Gómez	884
Cuidad Chemuyil	548
Manuel Antonio Hay	621
Total municipality	46,721

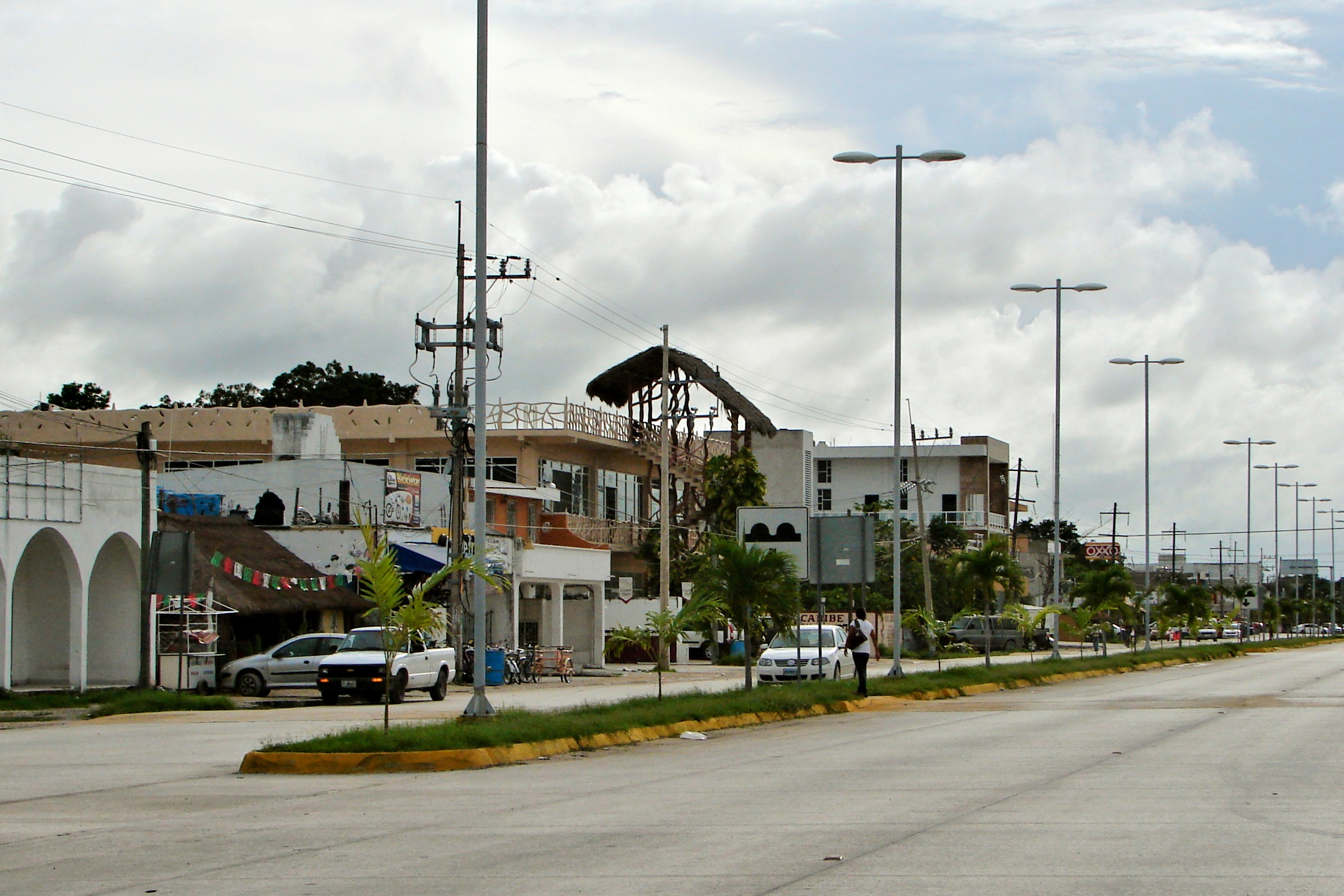
Tulum

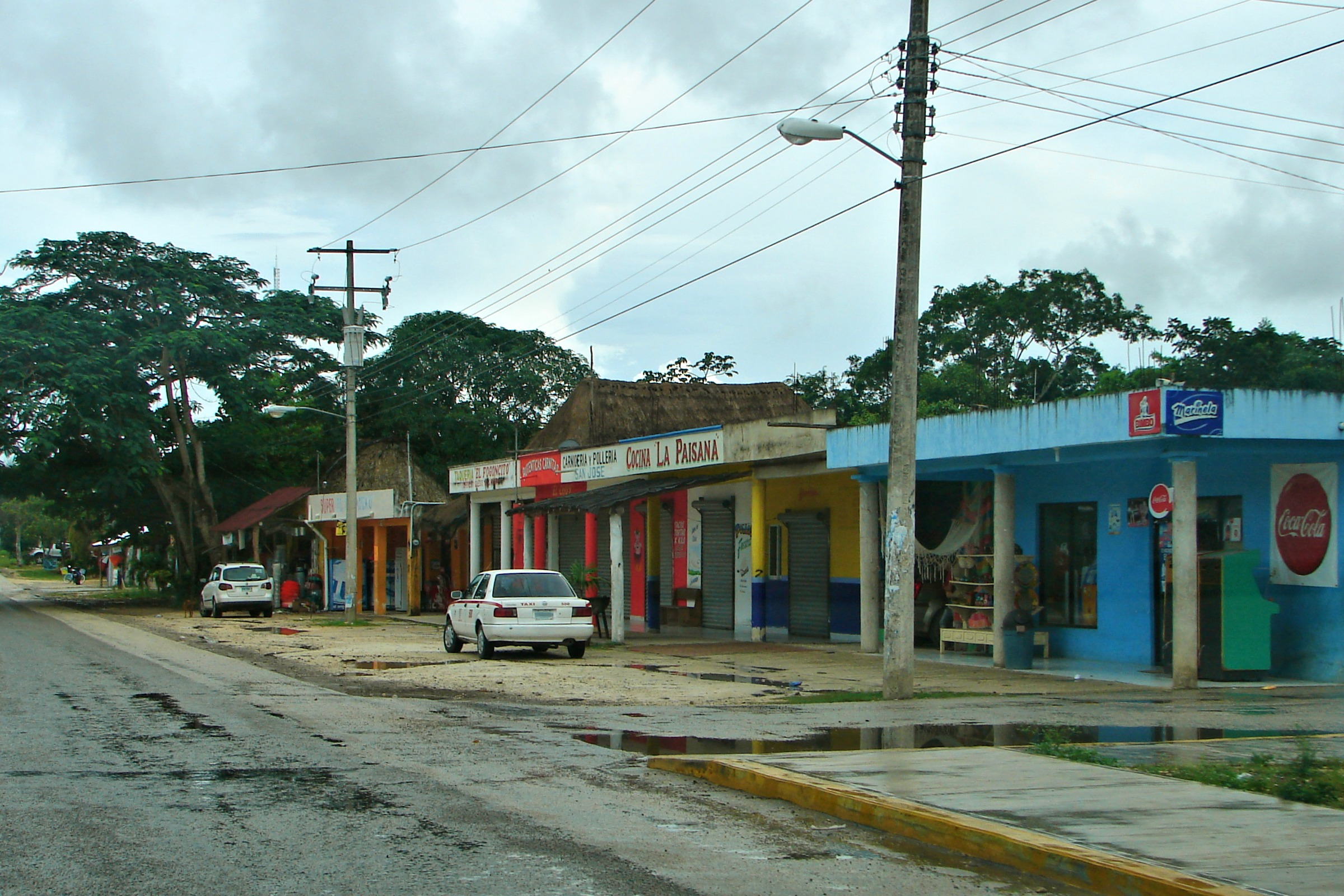
Francisco Hu May

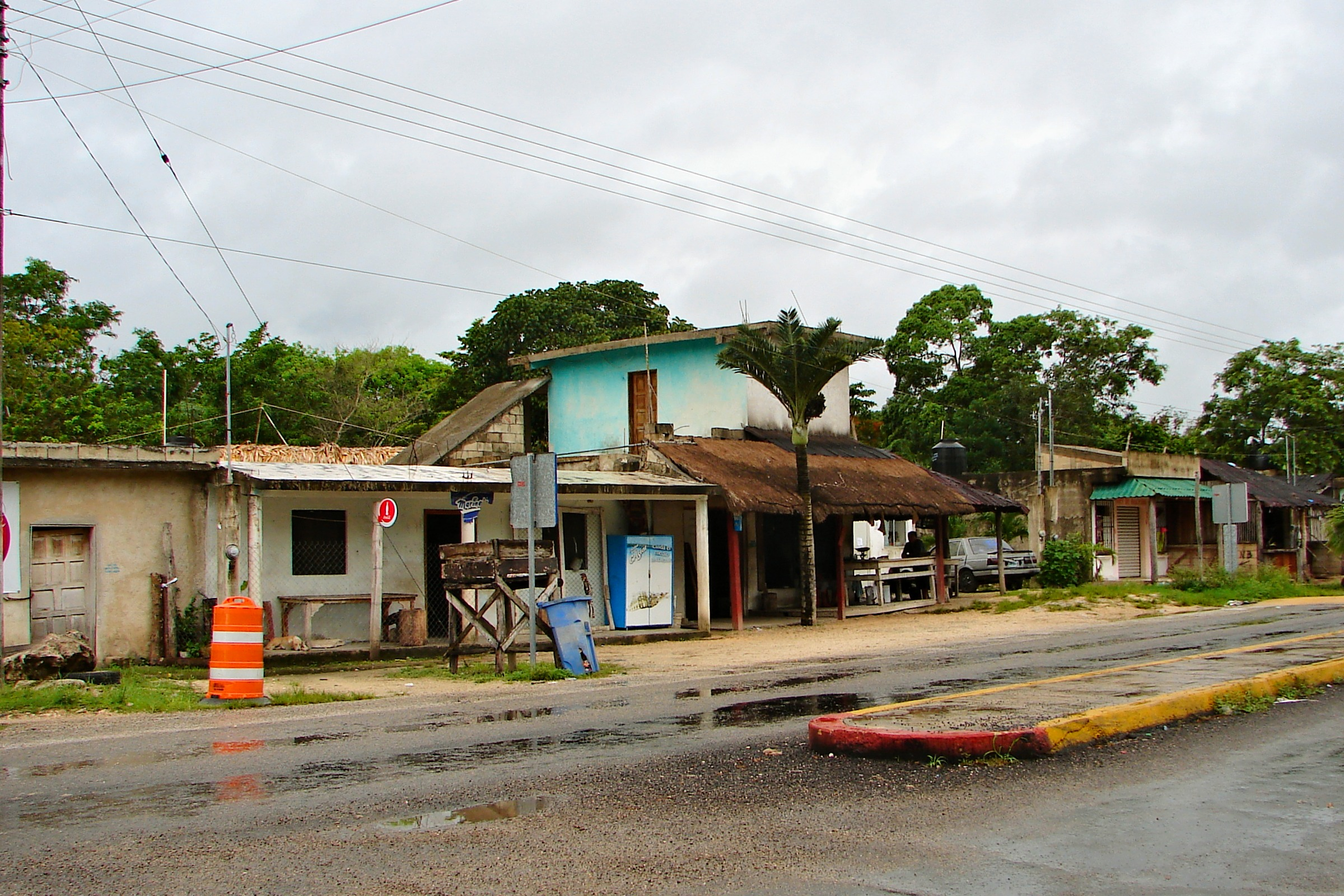
Macario Gomez

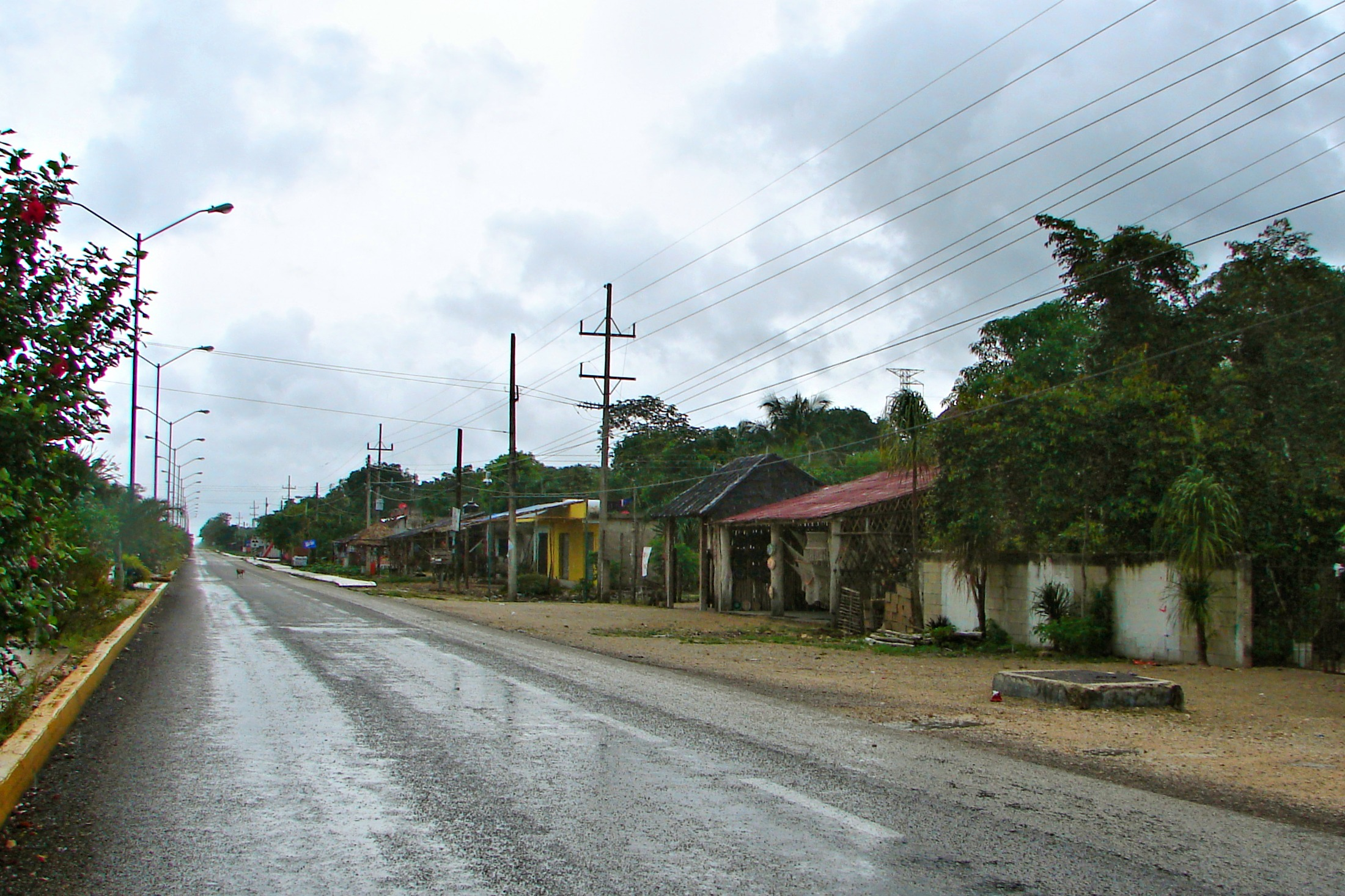
Manuel Antonio Hay

== Demographics ==
Historical population
Year	Pop.	±% p.a.
2010	28,263	—
2020 was the 2nd census year for Tulum. Source: INEGI Instituto Nacional de Estadística y Geografía

Tulum has 46,721 inhabitants according to the 2020 census, a figure that reflects over five percent annual growth since the last census in 2010. There is an additional 15,000 to 20,000 people living and working in Tulum as part of its floating population. That number rises and falls with the tourist season and is not reflected in the census figures.
