= Covington =

Covington may refer to:

== People ==
- Covington (surname)

== Places ==
=== United Kingdom ===
- Covington, Cambridgeshire
- Covington, South Lanarkshire

=== United States ===
- Covington, Georgia
- Covington, Indiana
- Covington, Iowa
- Covington, Kentucky, the largest American city named Covington
- Covington, Louisiana
- Covington, Michigan
- Covington, Missouri
- Covington, Nebraska
- Covington, New York
- Covington, Ohio
- Covington, Oklahoma
- Covington, Tennessee
- Covington, Texas
- Covington, Virginia
- Covington, Washington
- Fort Covington, New York
- Port Covington, a former cargo terminal in Baltimore, Maryland

== Navy vessels ==
- USS Covington (1863), a side-wheel steamer, purchased by the Union during the American Civil War
- USS Covington (ID-1409), a troop transport ship sunk by German U86 in 1918, World War I
- USS Covington (PF-56), a Tacoma class frigate built during World War II

== Other ==
- 5424 Covington (1983 TN1), a Main-belt Asteroid
- Camp Covington, Guam
- Covington Highway, in Metro Atlanta
- Covington River, in Virginia
- Covington and Ohio Railroad, part of a planned railroad link between eastern Virginia and the Ohio River
- Covington & Burling, a prominent law firm

== See also ==
- Covington County (disambiguation)
- Covington Township (disambiguation)
- Covington High School (disambiguation)
- Covington Municipal Airport (disambiguation)
- Corvington, a surname with similar spelling
