= William Covington =

William Covington may refer to:

- William Wallace Covington, professor of ecology
- William Jacob Covington, district court clerk of Camp County, Texas
- Bucky Covington (William Joel Covington III), American country music singer
- Tex Covington (William Wilkes Covington), pitcher in Major League Baseball
