= List of caves in Mexico =

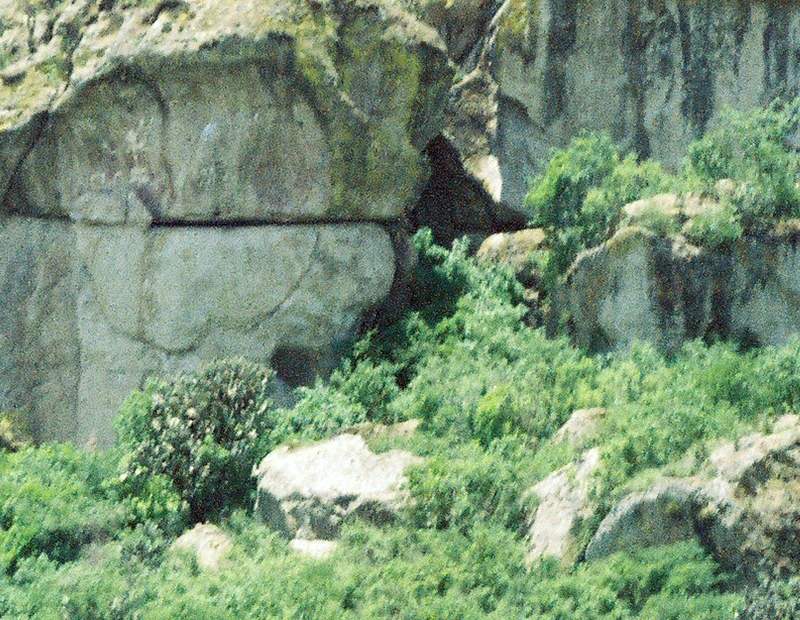
Guila Naquitz cave entrance, Oaxaca

A contemporary illustration of Painting 1 from Juxtlahuaca

This is a list of caves in Mexico (not just archaeological):

== Archaic era ==
- Guila Naquitz Cave (Oaxaca, c.8000-6700BC)
- Cueva de la Olla (Chihuahua, c.5500 BC)
- Nogales Cave (Tamaulipas, c. 5000-3000 BC)
- Coxcatlan Cave (Tehuacan Valley, Puebla, 5000-3400 BC)
- La Perra Cave (Tamaulipas, c. 3000-2200 BC)
- Frightful Cave (Central Mexican Highlands, c. 7500 BC-185 AD)

== Middle preclassic era ==
- Juxtlahuaca (Guerrero, Olmec-style painting cave)
- Oxtotitlan (Guerrero, Olmec-style painting cave)

== Late preclassic era ==
- Loltun Cave (Yucatán, a painting cave of Maya civilization)

== Postclassic era ==
- Balank'anche Cave (Yucatán, people offered a worship to Rain God and Xipe Totec with Toltec-style censers)

== Modern era ==
- Cacahuamilpa Cave (Grutas de Cacahuamilpa National Park, Guerrero)
- Chevé Cave (Oaxaca)
- Chiquihuitillos (Nuevo León)
- Grutas de García (Nuevo León)
- Naica Crystal Caves (Chihuahua), largest gypsum crystals in the world
- Sistema Dos Ojos (Quintana Roo), underwater cave system
- Sistema Huautla (Oaxaca), deepest cave in the western hemisphere (as of 2013)
- Sistema Nohoch Nah Chich (Quintana Roo), underwater cave system; subsumed into Sac Actun in early 2007
- Sistema Ox Bel Ha (Quintana Roo), world's longest underwater cave system
- Sistema Sac Actun (Quintana Roo), world's second longest underwater cave system
- Sótano de las Golondrinas (Cave of Swallows, San Luis Potosí)
- Sierra Mixteca-Zapoteca incl Ndaxagua formation on Juquila a.k.a. Xiquila River

== See also ==
- List of caves
- Maya cave sites
- Speleology
