= Sibun River =

Sheboon River Sibun River, Xibun River
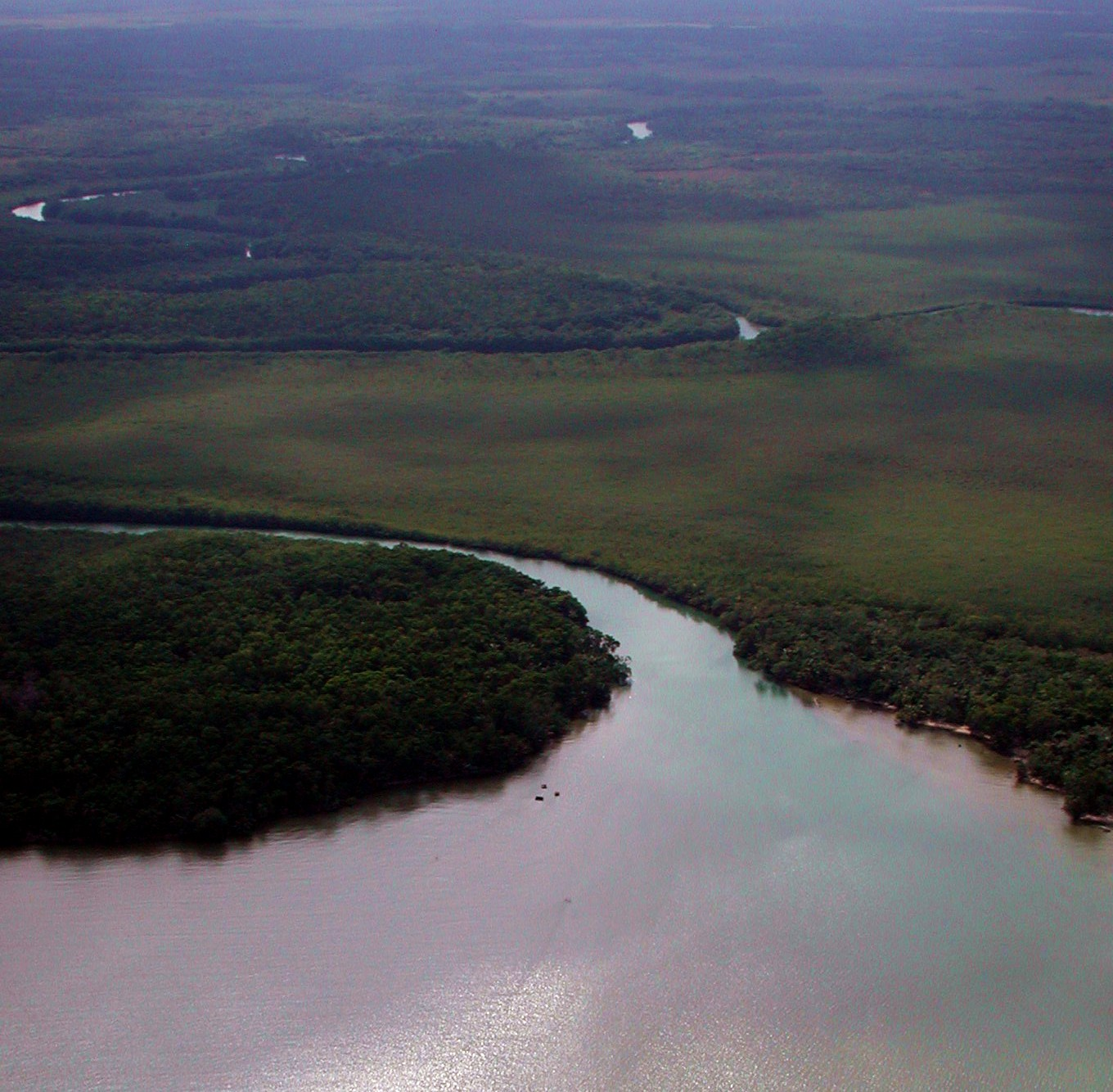
- The characteristic meanders of the lower reaches of the Sibun before it flows into the Caribbean
- Etymology: The ancient Xibun Mayans

Location
- Country: Belize

Physical characteristics
- Source
  - location: Maya Mountains
  - coordinates: 17°04′N 88°44′W
  - elevation: 600 m (2,000 ft)
- Mouth
  - location: Caribbean Sea 10 km south-west of Belize City
  - coordinates: 17°25′N 88°15′W
  - elevation: 0 m (0 ft)
- Basin size: Caribbean Sea

The Sibun River (Xibun River, colloquially Sheboon River) is a river in Belize which drains a large central portion of the country. The Sibun (Xibun) were ancient Maya people who inhabited the region.

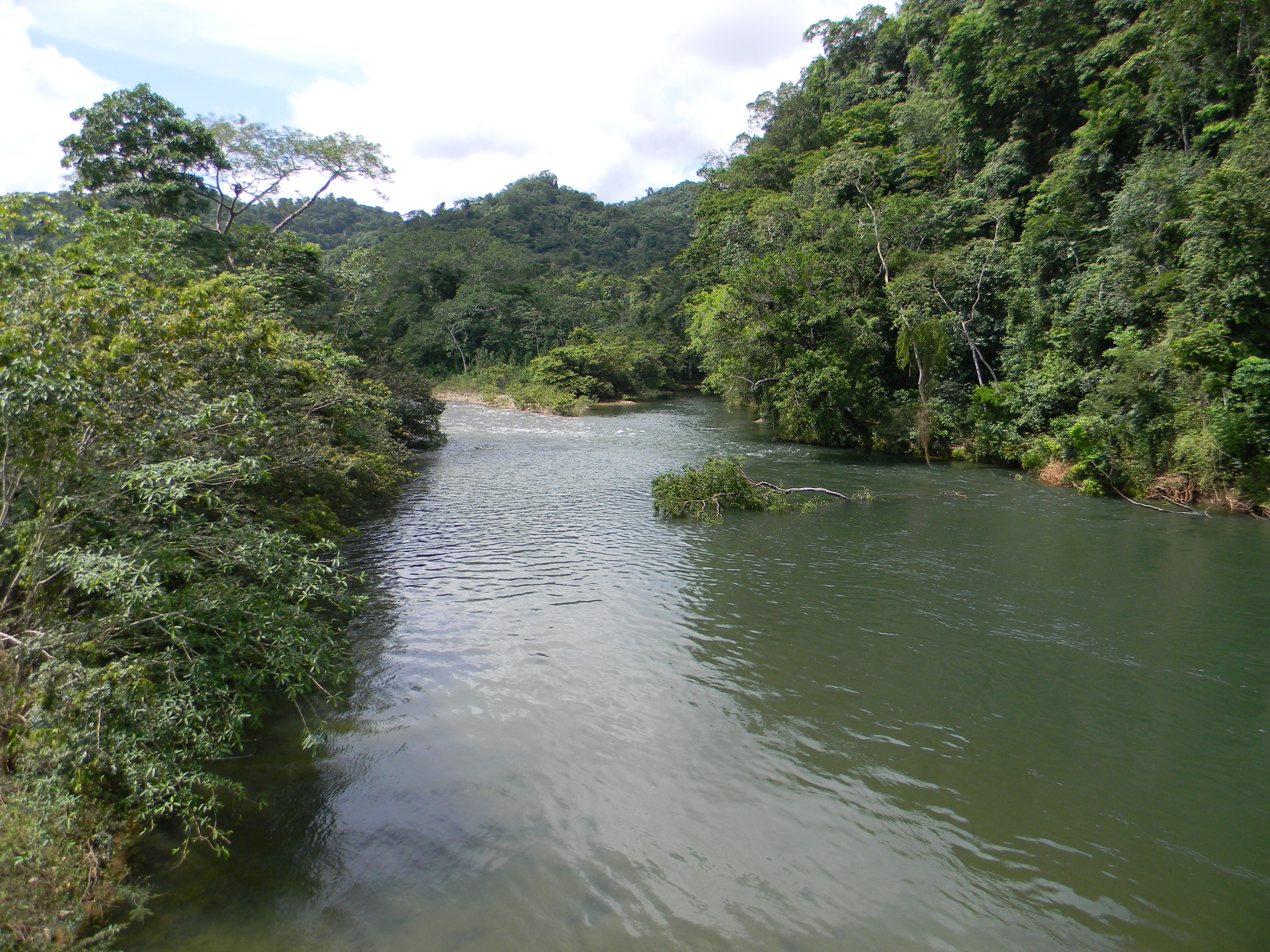
Sibun River, view from Hummingbird Highway

The headwaters of the Sibun River are located within the Maya Mountains, at approximately 800 meters above sea level, where the Sibun is known as the Caves Branch River. The river then flows through a gorge until it reaches an alluvial floodplain, where citrus and cacao plantations exist. Here the river valley is flanked by karst topography featuring Maya cave sites. Before the river reaches the village of Freetown Sibun, river figs and spiny bamboo (Guadua longifolia) are common along its banks; along the stretch of river between the coast and the village, mangroves are predominant. It empties into the Caribbean Sea, south of Belize City.

The Sibun River Watershed features several vegetation types, including tropical evergreen seasonal mixed needle forest, broadleaf forest, mangroves, and agriculture.

The Sibun Watershed Association is a local organization focused on environmental issues within the watershed.

Since 1999 Guatemala has claimed all Belizean land south of the Sibun River, although the claim is not internationally recognized. The current internationally accepted southern Belizean–Guatemalan border is the Sarstoon River. The claim is central to the ongoing Belizean–Guatemalan territorial dispute. Mexico once claimed the portion of Belize north of the Sibun River but dropped the claim in a treaty with Britain in 1893. Since then, Mexico has stated that it would revive the claim only if Guatemala were successful in obtaining all or part of the nation.

The lower reaches of the river are prominent in scenes from the 1986 film The Mosquito Coast.
