= Covington (surname) =

Covington (/ˈkʌvɪŋtən/) is a surname. Notable people with the surname include:

- Ann K. Covington, former chief justice of the Supreme Court of Missouri
- Arthur Covington (1913–2001), a Canadian physicist
- Bucky Covington (born 1977), singer and 8th-place finisher on the 5th season of American Idol
- Charles Covington, American jazz pianist
- Chet Covington (1910–1976), Major League Baseball pitcher
- Chris Covington (born 1996), American football player
- Christian Covington (born 1993), American football player
- Colby Covington (born 1988), American mixed martial artist
- Damien Covington (1972–2002), professional American football player
- Dennis Covington (1948–2024), American writer
- Donald Covington (1928–2002), former professor of design in the Art Department of San Diego State University
- Fred Covington (1912–1995), English cricketer
- George Washington Covington (1838–1911), American politician
- Grover Covington (born 1956), Canadian Football League player
- Harold Covington (1953–2018), American neo-Nazi and novelist
- Hayden C. Covington (1911–1978), legal counsel for the Watch Tower Bible and Tract Society
- Howard Covington British investment banker who was a founding shareholder and director of New Star Asset Management
- James Harry Covington (1870–1942), American jurist and politician
- Jerry Covington, American maker of custom motorcycles
- Jesse Whitfield Covington (1889–1966), United States Navy sailor who received the Medal of Honor during World War I
- Joey Covington (1945–2013), American drummer, best known for his involvements with Hot Tuna and Jefferson Airplane
- Julie Covington (born 1946), English singer and actress
- Kirk Covington, American drummer best known for his work with the jazz fusion group Tribal Tech
- Leonard Covington (1768–1813), US congressman and US general in War of 1812; namesake of various US cities
- Lucy Covington (1910–1982), activist for Native American emancipation
- Martell Covington, American politician
- Matt Covington (born 1980), American speleologist
- Robert Covington (born 1990), NBA forward
- Scott Covington (born 1976), former college and professional American football quarterback
- Syms Covington (c. 1816 – 1861), assistant to Charles Darwin
- Trisha Covington, African-American R&B singer
- Tony Covington (born 1967), former American football player
- Virginia M. Hernandez Covington (born 1955), American lawyer and federal judge
- Warren Covington (1921–1999), American jazz trombonist
- Wes Covington (1932–2011), Major League Baseball outfielder
- Wickliffe Covington (1867–1938), American painter
- William Jacob Covington (1838–1910), first district court clerk of the Camp County, Texas
