= Matt Covington =

American speleologist

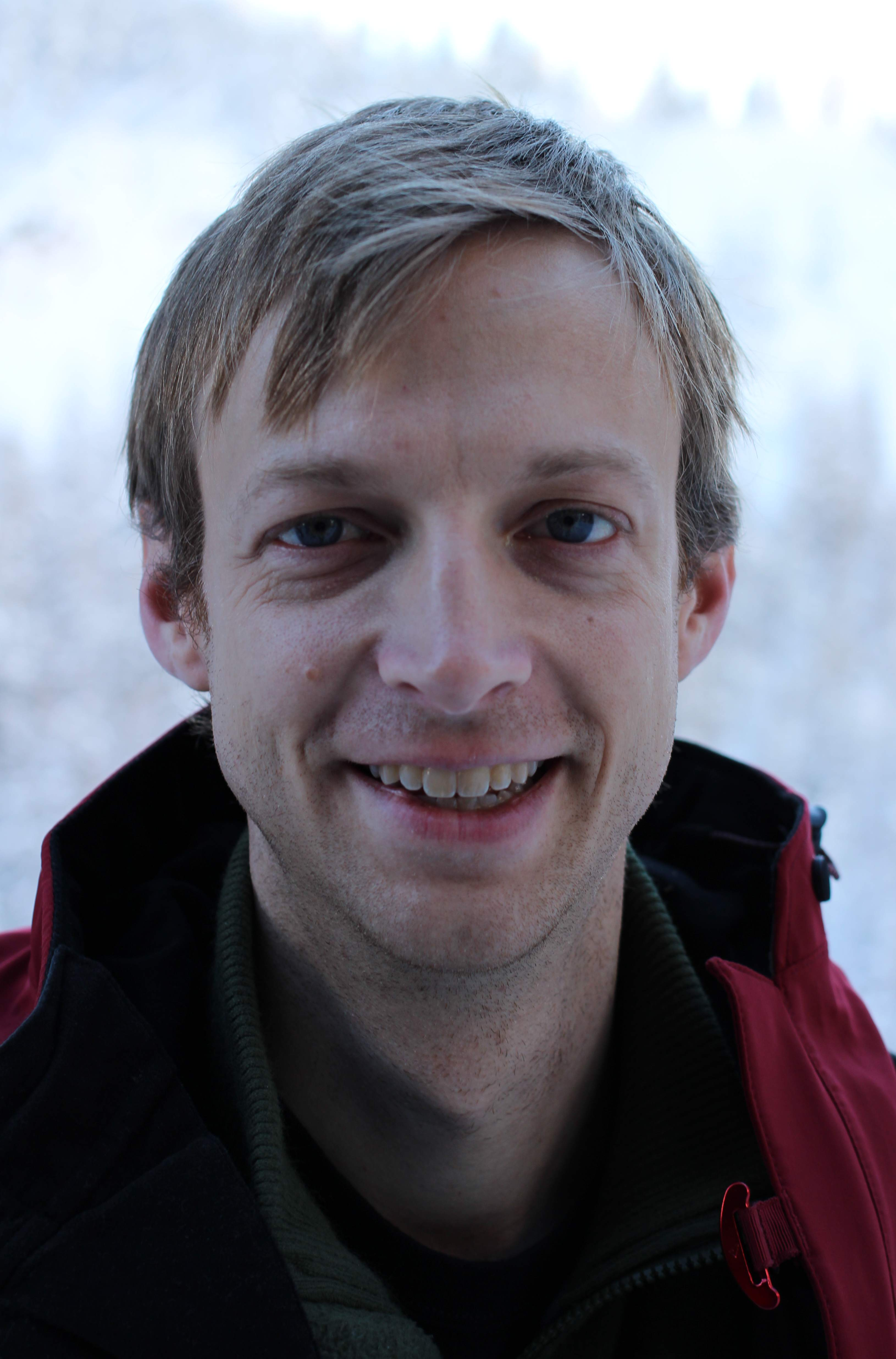
- at Vršič Pass in 2014
- Born: May 15, 1980 (age 46); Fort Worth, Texas
- Education: University of Arkansas; University of California, Santa Cruz
- Years active: 1998–present
- Known for: speleology, deep cave projects
- Spouse: Elizabeth (married 2002)
- Children: 2
- Website: http://www.speleophysics.com/

Matthew D. Covington (born May 15, 1980 in Fort Worth) is an American speleologist, most known for his work in hydrogeology and geomorphology, especially in the field of mathematical modeling of karst systems, as well as by his contribution to Cueva Cheve project in Mexico, since 1999.

== Early life, education and career ==
He was born in Fort Worth, his father is an electrical engineer, and his mother is a retired middle school teacher. After graduating high school in Fayetteville in 1998 he graduated in physics (The Trebuchet: Physics, numerics, and connections to millennia of human activity) and philosophy (Quantum mechanics and libertarian free will) at the University of Arkansas in 2002. In 2008 he completed his doctoral study in theoretical astrophysics at the University of California, Santa Cruz, with the thesis: The production and evolution of scaling laws via galaxy merging. After his PhD he pursued a postdoc study with a grant by NSF. In 2010 he completed it and started another postdoc in Postojna, Slovenia, also supported by NSF.

== Early caving ==
Covington grew up in a caving area, the Ozark Mountains, and first visited a cave at the age of 6. He became quite interested in caving at about 14, and at 15 he read the National Geographic report about Bill Stone's expedition to Huautla cave (NG, September 1995) which was decisive for his later caving. At 16 he joined the Boston Mountain Grotto in Fayetteville. At first it was recreational caving in the neighbourhood, the first expedition he took part in was to the Tongass National Forest in Southeast Alaska in the summer of 1999.

== Oaxaca caves ==
In 2004 he took part in Bill Stone's expedition to Cueva Chevé area in Mexico, when J2 cave was discovered. He was involved in all of the subsequent expeditions to Cueva J2 (2005, 2006, 2009, 2010, 2013) and co-led the 2010 expedition with Marcin Gala and Jon Lillestolen. In 2009 he dove through the sump in the bottom of J2 with Marcin Gala and established the first camp on the far side of the sump. He also participated in the expeditions to Cueva Chevé and Peña Negra cave in 2016.

He also joined an expedition to the Huautla area to Cueva de Rio Iglesia during 2007. During this expedition, Matt and Yuri Schwartz found a connection between Cueva de Rio Iglesia and the rest of Sistema Huautla. The previous team that had explored to the bottom of Rio Iglesia in 1967 had been stopped by a sand plug. When Matt and Yuri reached the bottom of the cave they found that the plug had been opened and the passage quickly lead to a connection with Cueva de San Augustin.

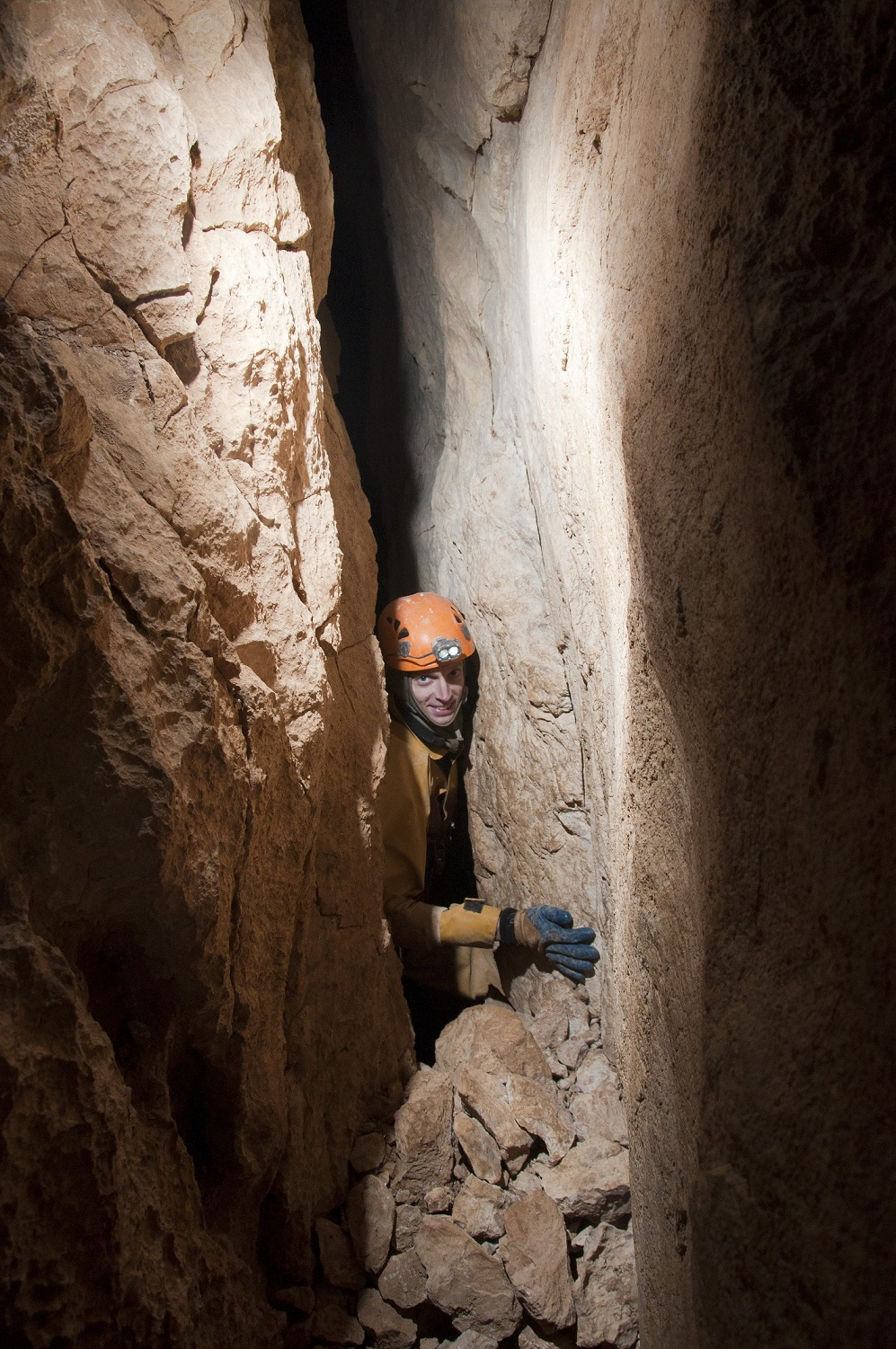
Covington in Evklidova piščal, by Matic Di Batista

== Julian Alps caves ==
From August 2010 to August 2012, Covington worked as a postdoc at the Karst Research Institute in Postojna, Slovenia, supported by a National Science Foundation International Research Fellowship. While there, he worked with Franci Gabrovšek, who had a similar academic background in that he was a physicist by training but was using physics to understand processes occurring in caves. Covington read the book "Processes of Speleogenesis: A modeling approach", co-authored by Gabrovšek, and met Gabrovšek at the Karst Waters Institute "Future directions in karst research" conference in San Antonio, TX. During this period, Covington joined DZRJL, Ljubljana Cave Exploration Society, and began exploration of caves in Slovenia. He discovered a new caving area on Pokljuka near the mountain Viševnik.

The first cave discovered on Pokljuka was Evklidova piščal (pron. Evcledovah peshchal, translated as Euclid's flute), which Covington found as a blowing hole in the fall of 2010. This was the first major cave found on the Pokljuka plateau aside from Medvedova konta. After initial exploration in Evklidova piščal the DZRJL began systematic exploration of the area for new caves. Many small caves were found. In the summer of 2013 Covington led an international expedition to the area in collaboration with DZRJL. During this time the team found another promising cave, Platonovo šepetanje (pron. Plahtonovoh shepetanya, translated as Plato's whisper) cave. Later that fall, cavers from DZRJL found the next large cave, Trubarjev dah (pron. Troobaryev dah, translated as Trubar's breath). The caves in this area are relatively complex and exploration continues on many fronts. Trubarjev dah, Platonovo šepetanje and Romeo cave, the entrance of which is located above the two, have been connected to a system close to 10 km in length and over 670 m deep. The team is still searching for a connection with Evklidova piščal, Covington joined the effort at the end of 2019.

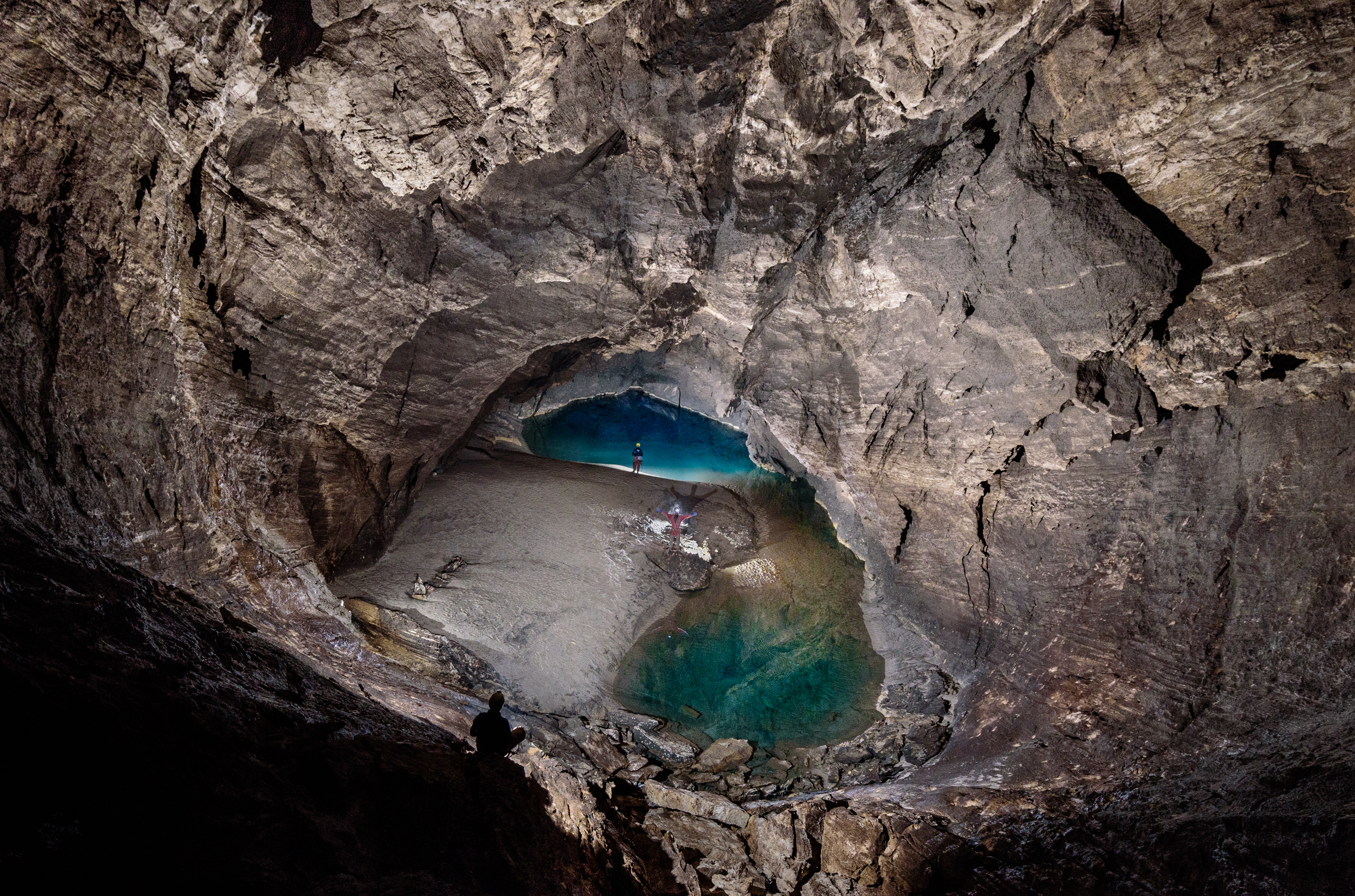
Matt's sump from the top of the final descent, Renejevo brezno, by Uroš Kunaver

Given his experience with diving in deep vertical caves, Covington was asked by DZRJL member Mitja Prelovšek to conduct an initial exploration dive into the sump at the bottom of Renejevo brezno on Mt. Kanin. Covington was relatively inexperienced in exploration diving and agreed to conduct a very short reconnaissance dive. He had only a 5 mm wetsuit and planned for a maximum dive duration of 20 minutes. After 30 m of horizontal continuation at a depth of approximately 10 meters, he saw an airbell above and ascended into it. There was no obvious continuation within the pocket above and at this point he decided to finish the dive and returned to Copacabana. Covington's dive computer read a water temperature of 0.5 °C. The main tunnel continued to descend, but Covington did not have time to continue exploration there.

== Other pursuits ==
Covington has also participated in cave exploration expeditions to Peru (2004), Sumatra (2000), the Purificacion area of Northern Mexico (2000, 2001), Grotte des Chamois in France (2011), Lukina jama in Croatia (2011), to caves in Wulong County China (2012), to glacier caves of Nepal and Svalbard.

In 2025, he was featured in a CNN article regarding Grant Hardin’s escape from the high-security Calico Rock prison in northern Arkansas. He explained, that with over 1500 caves in northern Arkansas, Hardin could easily be camped within the caves.
