= Cueva Ahumada =

Cueva Ahumada - Archaeological Site
- Name: Cueva Ahumada
Location	García, Nuevo León; Mexico
Coordinates	29°35′40.04″N 108°09′25.15″W
Culture	Coahuiltecan - Alazapa
Period	6,000 Before Present
- Foundation
- Decline
Language	Cohauilteco
INAH Official Page	Non existent

Cueva Ahumada is an archaeological site located within several canyons in the village of La Rinconada, García Municipality, in the Mexican state of Nuevo León. Cave painting in northeastern Mexico covers two types of artwork: rock engraving, also called petroglyphs (Pictogram or pictographs). A third type of rock art, geoglyphs so far has not been detected in this region.

Cave painting art is found in all human occupied continents, it is a world heritage, as proclaimed by UNESCO. Its antiquity goes back to the dawn of human prehistory. In France and Spain, the most ancient cave paintings date back to 30,000 years Before Present (BP).

== Northeastern México - Cave Painting ==
In the American Continent, these manifestations occurred from one end of the continent to the other and can be traced back to its first settlers. In northeastern Mexico, human occupation is confirmed at least to the end of the last ice age, approximately 10,500 BP. Some sites have earlier occupations, Radiocarbon dated to the early Archaic period in the Americas, as is the case in Cueva Ahumada, Garcia, from 6000 BP. It cannot be safely claimed that age, but there is a possibility.

== First Settlers ==
A lot remains to be studied about the first settlers of northern Mexico, especially in Nuevo León, of those who left permanent marks on rocks of Frontón Piedras Pintas in the municipality of Parás; Boca de Potrerillos and Chiquihuitillos in Mina; Cueva Ahumada, Nacataz and Icamole in the municipality of García Municipality, and hundreds of other sites scattered throughout the State of Nuevo León.

These settlers often are simply described as Chichimecas or Aridoamerica ethnic groups of the north, to differentiate them from the large and rich cultural Mesoamerica groups. However, the term is often misused as Chichimeca denotes the group of Nahua tribes which inhabited the area collectively known as La Gran Chichimeca, while Coahuiltecan people represented a different ethnolinguistic group and inhabited a different region. Most linguists now reject the view that the Coahuiltecan peoples of southern Texas and adjacent Mexico spoke a single or related languages.

They are said to have been Nomads or semi-nomads, but did not just wander about, they followed "regular movement patterns" within recognized territories; What anthropologists define as territorial nomadism". The truth is that they did not build urban complexes as the center of Mexico, whose splendor cast a shadow that diminished Aridoamerica study for a long time.

Specialists have differentiated several language nucleus among the tribes that inhabited the region, but have failed to have a consistent approach by placing them in the families of the Athabaskan languages, the Coahuilteco language or the Hokan languages. Those who inhabited the region of what is now the city of Monterrey were called Los Aguaceros and Malincheños.

They lived in caves and river ravines. Where vestiges of their life were left in paintings and rock engravings, items that could be used as amulets in fertility or puberty initiation rites, mortars (Molcajetes), carved stones and spear points of all kinds, ranging from some several thousands of years ago (such as those found in the municipality of Los Ramones, Nuevo León, over 11,000 years old) to those used by Comanche tribes, well into the 19th century. The density of prehistoric domestic waste, found in the area confirm that there was a relatively large population, at least seasonally. Radiocarbon tests placed the earliest occupation in Boca de Potrerillos about 8000 years ago.

== Cueva Ahumada Exploration ==
Between 1960 and 1967, an archaeologists group from the University of Texas, Austin, headed by Jeremiah f. Epstein, undertook an extensive research program in the area.

The program started the Nuevo León prehistory discovery. American archaeologists who participated became the first generation of trained specialists. Worked at sites that revealed the first State prehistoric cultural sequences, but provided very little data on rock art. These sites are primarily located in the Center and South of the State, and the project focuses on the sequence of stone artifacts. Virtually ignores the existence of cave painting manifestations, to the extent that the final publication on La Calzada, Nuevo León, the archaeologists do not even mention the existence of paintings and petroglyphs located at few meters from the excavation place.

Only one site with cave paintings was excavated, Cueva Ahumada, and John Clark brief report is the only publication on the cave painting produced by the Texan project. Obviously the report is based on a brief visit, documents only a small sample of the paintings and petroglyphs present, and provided minimum comments about the relationship with the associated archaeological context. The Cueva Ahumada Texan project provided the first radiocarbon dates Nuevo León, but the rest of the results were never published. Recent excavations led by Moises Valadez provided more comprehensive data on the context of this site. However modest, the Clark report seems to be the first reference on Nuevo León cave painting art in scientific literature, and starting point for all subsequent studies.

In contrast to the indifference to cave painting art by Texan investigators, the visit to Cueva Ahumada by Mexican archaeologist Antonieta Espejo provided a unique site description, before the first excavations. She belonged to the first generation of Mexican archaeologists trained in the 1940s, and although developed most of her professional career in other parts of Mexico, her short stay in Nuevo León in the 1960s produced the first documentation of several cave painting art sites in the State. She performed the first time evaluation of cave painting art of the region. Her visit to Cueva Ahumada is not intended to be more than a mere recognition, but greatly expanded our vision of the site environment. Collected valuable information from local informants and documented the pristine condition of a site which, in later years, has undergone much damage and misfortune.

== Project affects the Site ==
Recently a road was built near the archaeological site, over the next few months site rehabilitation works will be made as well as the placement of a wire mesh to control visitor access.

Pathway construction has not damaged the paintings area, although these have temporarily disappeared, covered by the large amount of dust lifted at the road side.

INAH specialists have reported that rain will "naturally" wash the rocks and the more-than-5000-year-old painting will again be visible.

Once the road work is completed, INAH archaeologists will begin cleaning the archaeological area, as well as installation of a wire mesh and the path ways to allow access for visitors, because since the paintings are located atop a rock shelter, climbing is complicated and risky.

== Other Sites in Nuevo León ==
- Frontón de Piedras Pintas, Parás Municipality.
- Boca de Potrerillos and Chiquihuitillos in Mina, Nuevo León
- Cueva Ahumada, Nacataz and Icamole, in García, Nuevo León.
- Another site in Los Ramones, Nuevo León, over 11,000 years old.
