= Wickliffe Cooper =

Robert Wickliffe Cooper
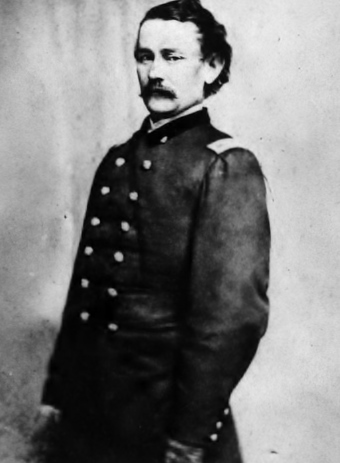
- Born: October 19, 1831; Lexington, Kentucky, US
- Died: June 8, 1867 (aged 35); Medicine Lake Creek, Nebraska, US
- Burial place: Lexington Cemetery; Kentucky
- Military career
- Allegiance: United States; Union
- Branch: United States Army; Union Army
- Service years: 1861–67
- Rank: Colonel
- Units: 20th Kentucky Infantry Regiment; 7th U.S. Cavalry Regiment
- Commands: 4th Kentucky Cavalry Regiment
- Conflicts: American Civil War: Battle of Shiloh; Siege of Corinth; Battle of Richmond; Battle of Chickamauga; Wilson's Raid; American Indian Wars

Robert Wickliffe Cooper (October 19, 1831 – June 8, 1867) was a United States Army officer and cavalry commander of the American Civil War. He rarely used his real first name and thus appears in most documents as Wickliffe Cooper.

== Early life ==
Robert Wickliffe Cooper was born in Lexington, Kentucky, on October 19, 1831. Wickliffe Cooper attended Dickinson College in Pennsylvania for two years; He was in the class of 1851.

== Military career ==
Cooper enlisted in the army as a private at Louisville, Kentucky, in 1861 at the outbreak of the Civil War. He was made a Sergeant on November 15, 1861, and was commissioned as second lieutenant in the 20th Kentucky Infantry on January 24, 1862. From February to July 1862 he was the Acting aide-de-camp (ADC) and Acting Assistant Adjutant general (AAG) for the 22nd Brigade of the 4th Division in the Army of the Ohio. At the Battle of Corinth he said to have "exhibited bravery even to rashness" in an official report by Colonel Thomas D. Sedgewick. In a report that Sedgewick made earlier the same month, he said of Cooper: "Asst. Adjt. Gen. Wickliffe Cooper, as on all occasions before, exhibited the greatest bravery. The coolness and precision with which he made the several reconnaissances ordered by me amid the greatest danger merit the highest praise." In July 1862 he was made the ADC to Maj. General William Nelson. At the Battle of Richmond (August 1862), he was singled out for honors by a Union Army general. He was taken prisoner and paroled on August 30, 1862, in Richmond, Kentucky, as part of a prisoner exchange.

Cooper was recommissioned as lieutenant-colonel of the 4th Kentucky Cavalry on March 26, 1863, and became its colonel in April; following the resignation of Col. Bayles. (Note: Hunt states that he was made Lt. Colonel on April 13, 1863 and Colonel on May 29, 1863.) On June 4, 1863, Cooper was injured when a horse fell on him in Franklin, Tennessee. He commanded the regiment at the Battle of Chickamauga in September 1864. Cooper returned to Lexington, Kentucky in 1864 for sick leave. Then Cooper led local forces against John Hunt Morgan's raiders. He refused Morgan's demands for the surrender of Lexington on June 9, 1864 and repulsed his troops. In April 1865 he commanded the post of Montgomery, Alabama, and in May and July 1865 the post of Albany, Georgia. He was honorably mustered out on August 21, 1865, at Macon, Georgia. He received battle honors for his service at Shiloh, Corinth, Richmond, Chickamauga, Morgan's Raid into Kentucky, the Battle of Resaca and for Wilson's Raid on Montgomery. He was brevetted to Lt. Colonel and Colonel in the Regular Army on March 2, 1867, for gallant and meritorious services at the Battle of Resaca in Georgia and in the capture of Montgomery, Alabama.

In 1866 Cooper, rejoining the army as a regular, was appointed Major of the 7th Cavalry where he served on the western frontier under Lt. Colonel George Armstrong Custer. He was the second in command at Fort McPherson, Nebraska, but by the time he received this position he was deeply affected by alcoholism. During an expedition against the Cheyenne and the Sioux, Cooper ran out of whiskey. This apparently caused him to experience serious withdrawal symptoms. He died from a self-inflicted gunshot "while in a fit of delirium tremens" on June 8, 1867, at a Medicine Lake Creek encampment, about 50 miles southeast of Fort McPherson, Nebraska. Custer wrote, "But for the intemperance Col. Cooper would have been a useful and accomplished officer, a brilliant and most companionable gentleman. He leaves a young wife, shortly to become a mother." His death was initially ruled suicide, but the cause of death was later changed to "died by hand of person or persons unknown, while in the line of his duty as an officer of the army" by the United States War Department in 1885, so his widow could receive his pension.

== Marriage and family ==
Wickliffe Cooper was married to Sarah Steele Venable. Wickliffe and Sarah had a daughter, artist Mary Wickliffe Cooper.
