= Chiquihuitillos =

Archaeological site in Nuevo León, Mexico

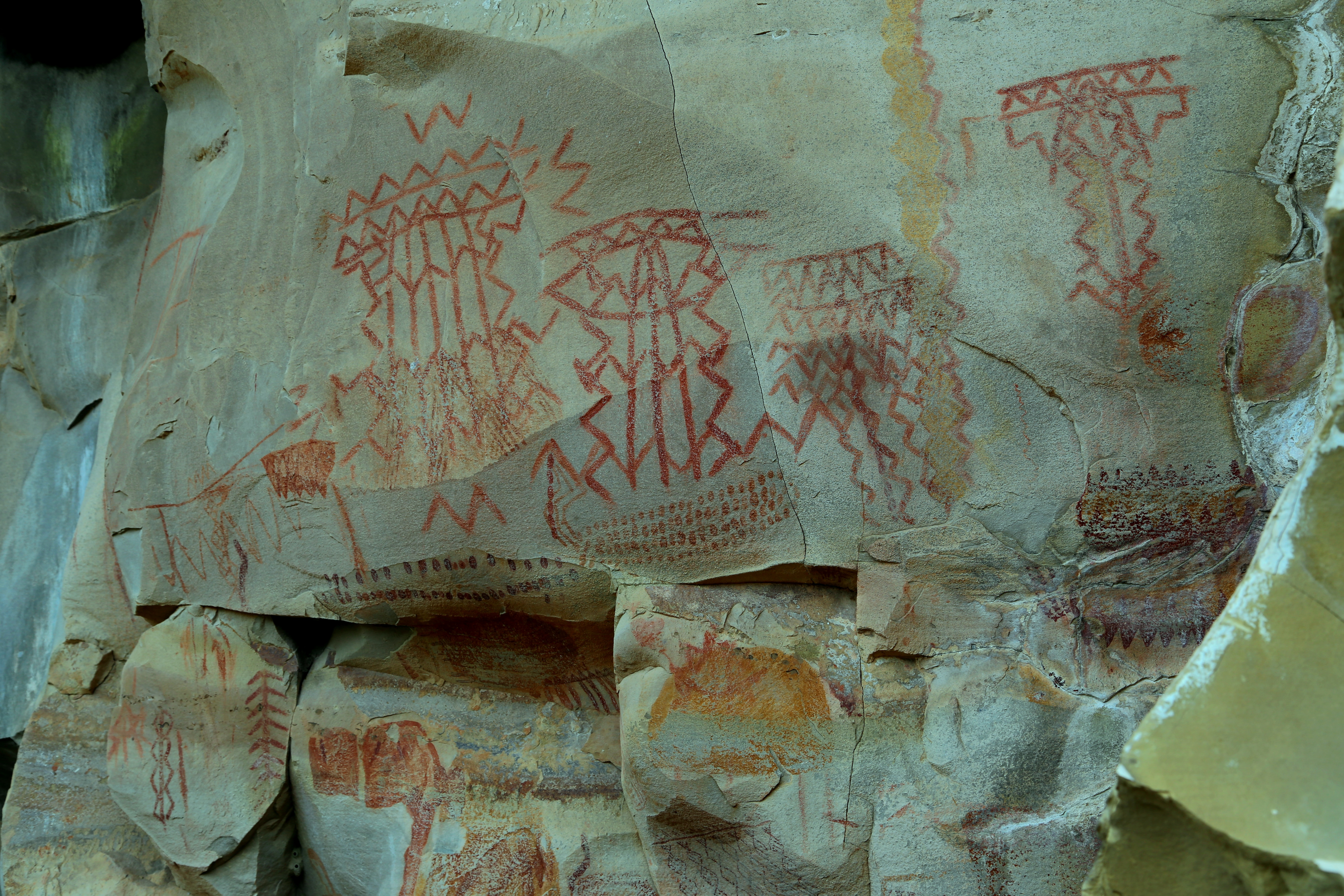
- Interactive map of Chiquihuitillos
- 26°25′1.24″N 100°35′18.82″W
- Type: Rock art
- Cultures: Coahuiltecan, Alzapa
- Location: Mina, Nuevo Leon, Mexico

History
- Built: c. 4000 BC

Site notes
- Management: Instituto Nacional de Antropología e Historia

Chiquihuitillos is an archaeological site situated in the municipality of Mina in Nuevo León, Mexico. The site is renowned for its petroglyphs and holds significance in the region's history.

Positioned in a desert region near the towns of Mina, Villaldama, and Bustamante, Chiquihuitillos boasts one of the most abundant collections of cave paintings in Mexico. It comprises several hills housing numerous rock shelters where ancient tribes depicted drawings and inscribed elements reflecting their cosmological perspectives.

The region was previously inhabited by indigenous Alzapas who spoke the Coahuilteco language. The exact population residing at the site remains uncertain, as it appears to have functioned more as a visiting area rather than a permanent settlement. Presently, the lack of water in the vicinity suggests it was not suitable for sustaining a population. Unlike other Mesoamerican cultures, there are no traces of pyramids left by the tribes. However, the significance and monumental nature of the paintings found on ravines and cliffs remain noteworthy.

Specialists have observed that northeastern Mexico possesses a distinct yet equally significant archaeological heritage compared to other regions of the country. Anthropologist Roberto Rebolloso has noted a prevalent misconception that the northern region lacks archaeological significance, leading to the dismissal of archaeological study of cultural processes in this area.

== Site ==
Researchers have suggested that the area served as a site for ceremonies and astronomical observations, albeit with a distinctive style that has garnered attention among anthropologists.

According to William Breen Murray, an archaeologist and professor at the University of Monterrey, Chiquihuitillos is regarded as one of the most significant cave art sites in the region. Murray highlights two key aspects: the site's notable concentration of cave paintings and its similarities with other sites in the contiguous region, suggesting a broader tradition.

The painting zone at Chiquihuitillos covers a vast area, prominently shaping much of the site's landscape. Thousands of rocks adorned with petroglyphs are scattered across the lower part of the hill, while petroglyphs are also found at both the base and the summit of the plateau. Notably, the paintings exhibit distinct differences from the older petroglyphs, suggesting they may belong to separate traditions. The style of the paintings bears resemblance to cave paintings found along the Rio Grande at the mouth of the Pecos River. These paintings are attributed to the Pecos style, which dates back approximately four thousand years, aligning with the estimated age of the paintings at the Chiquihuitillos site.

== Art style ==
The art style, named after the site, is prevalent across a region extending approximately 60 kilometers to the north. This area encompasses the municipalities of Villa Aldama, Bustamante, and Lampazos, and extends as far as Candela, Coahuila. To the southwest, the region includes Mina, García, and a portion of Ramos Arizpe Municipality.

The art style observed at Chiquihuitillos is characterized by its multicolored paintings, featuring hues of red, white, black, orange, and yellow. While Murray identifies certain paintings as astronomical motifs, the overall significance of the site is not exclusively defined by astronomy.

== Rock art analysis ==
The prehistory of northeastern Mexico has been characterized by lingering uncertainties, which persisted into the 21st century. This is partly attributed to a political and cultural barrier that was established in the 19th century. During this time, settlers and archaeologists often regarded the remains of Native American sites as lacking value or interest. However, contemporary understanding suggests that cave images provide valuable insights into the hunter-gatherer lifestyle that predominated during much of prehistory. These paintings and carvings offer a glimpse into the knowledge generated by the direct dependence on nature and the utilization of simple yet effective technologies.

Northeastern rock art encompasses two main forms: rock engravings, also known as petroglyphs, and cave paintings, referred to as pictograms or pictographs. Geoglyphs, a third type of cave art, have not yet been identified in the region. Petroglyphs are the most prevalent form of rock art found in the area. These figures are created using various techniques such as picking and scraping, resulting in representative images, abstract symbols, and simple marks on the rock surfaces. In contrast, cave paintings involve the application of natural pigments directly onto rock surfaces and are typically found in areas protected from natural elements. The tools used for these artworks varied from pointed stones to feathers or fingers, although the specific instruments used are rarely recognizable in archaeological records. Despite differences in technique, both engraving and painting often coexist in the same locations, with repeated patterns observed in both forms. These shared patterns indicate related traditions or cultural activities, allowing for their grouping under the category of northeastern rock art.

Rock art is found across the Americas and has roots dating back to the earliest settlers. In northeastern Mexico, human occupation is documented to have occurred at least by the end of the last ice age, approximately 10,500 years Before Present (BP). Some sites indicate even earlier occupation, with radiocarbon dating placing them in the early Archaic period. For example, sites like Boca de Potrerillos in Mina, dating to 7600 BP, and Cueva Ahumada in García, dating to 6000 BP, provide evidence of early human activity. The age of the cave art at Chiquihuitillos may similarly date back to this period.

Researcher Solveig A. Turpin identified several cave sites featuring a similar style in northern Coahuila, indicating the diffusion of this style to the south, within the Mexican border. While the Chiquihuitillos style exhibits differences from cave paintings in Nuevo León, similarities are observed due to shamanistic practices associated with peyote use in both regions.

== See also ==
- Boca de Potrerillos
- Cueva Ahumada
- List of caves in Mexico
