= Xibun =

Coordinates: 17°25′N 88°15′W

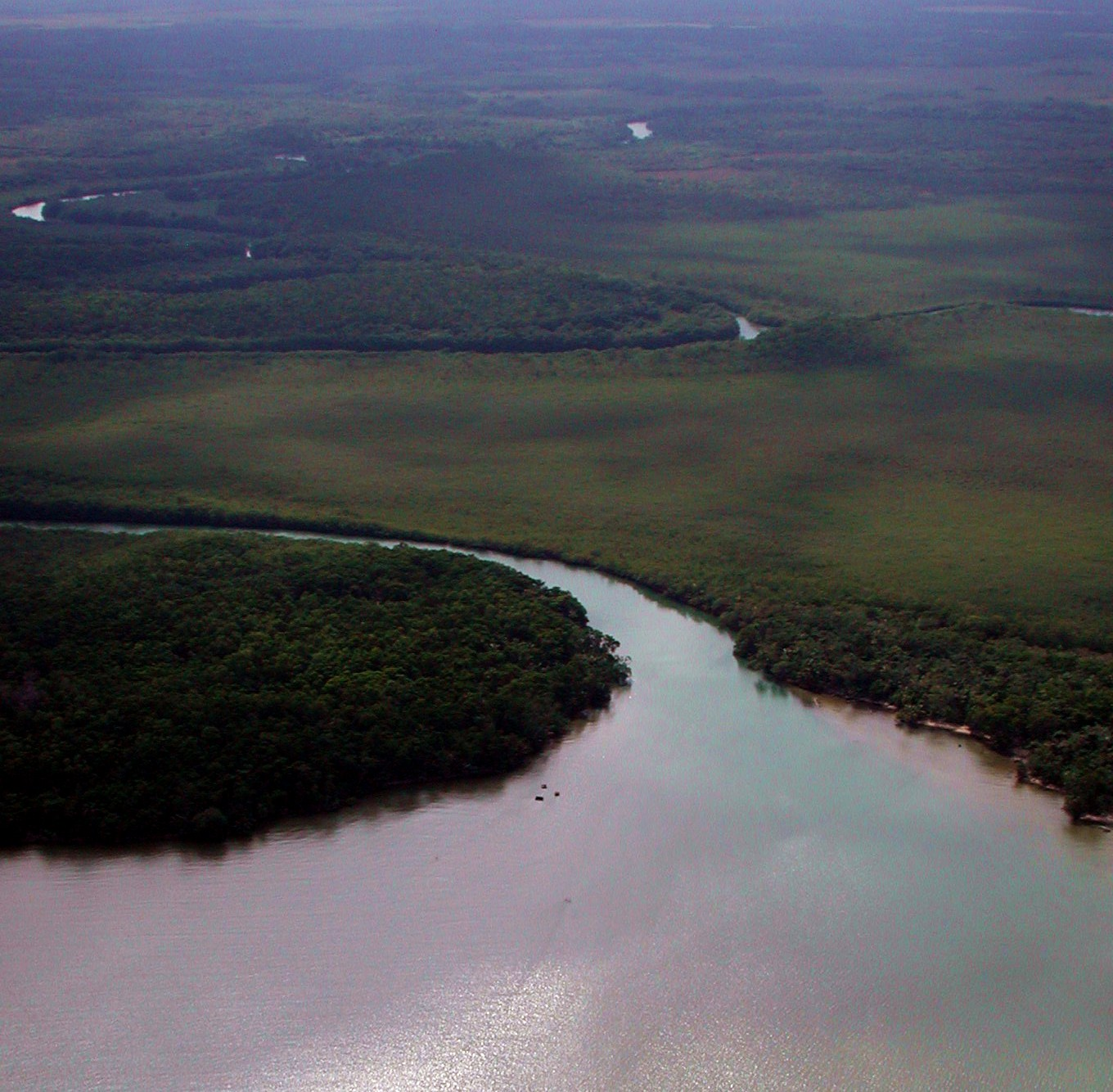
Aerial view showing the characteristic meanders of the lower reaches of the Xibun or Sibun River before it flows into the Caribbean Sea.

Xibun is an alternate Mayan spelling of Sibun that appears on some Spanish colonial-period maps of the region, and is sometimes used to refer to:

- the Sibun River located in central Belize
- ancient or historic Maya settlers in the Sibun River valley

== Xibun Maya ==
Xibun may denote the ancient and historic Maya inhabitants of the Sibun River valley.

The Sibun River meanders through a Karst topography containing countless Maya cave sites. A significant contribution of archaeological research in the area has been the documentation of the ritual use of caves by the Xibun Maya. Of particular note, a pattern of speleothem (cave formation) breakage was documented in caves that was explained by their incorporation into public architecture at prehistoric settlements located across the river.
