= Ndaxagua =

Cave & archaeology site in Mexico

Ndaxagua (also Ndaxagua cave, Ndaxagua natural tunnel), locally known in Spanish as El Puente Colosal ("Colossal [Natural] Bridge") is a natural cave with double entrance and archaeological site, located in the extreme northern end of the Coixtlahuaca Basin, central-southern Mexico. The cave was most likely used by Mesoamerican cultures such as the Zapotec and Mixtec as well.

The cave gets its name from a natural rock bridge formation above it. The cave functioned as a sacred entrance into the basin. Several Coixtlahuaca codices refer to this cave. In codex depictions, the cave was believed to be the place where Quetzalcoatl descended from heaven.

There are several pre-Columbian inscriptions at the Ndaxagua site. These murals in the cave depict anthropomorphic figures with protruding beak-like mask. Another mural shows a deer ready to be sacrificed by a figure holding a blades. Another sacrificial mural is present as well.

== Location ==
The region belongs to the communities of Tepelmeme Villa de Morelos and Santa María Ixcatlán and is part of the protected semi-desert area of the Tehuacán-Cuicatlán Biosphere Reserve at Juquila River.

== See also ==
- List of caves in Mexico
- Maya cave sites
