= Grutas de García =

Cave in Mexico

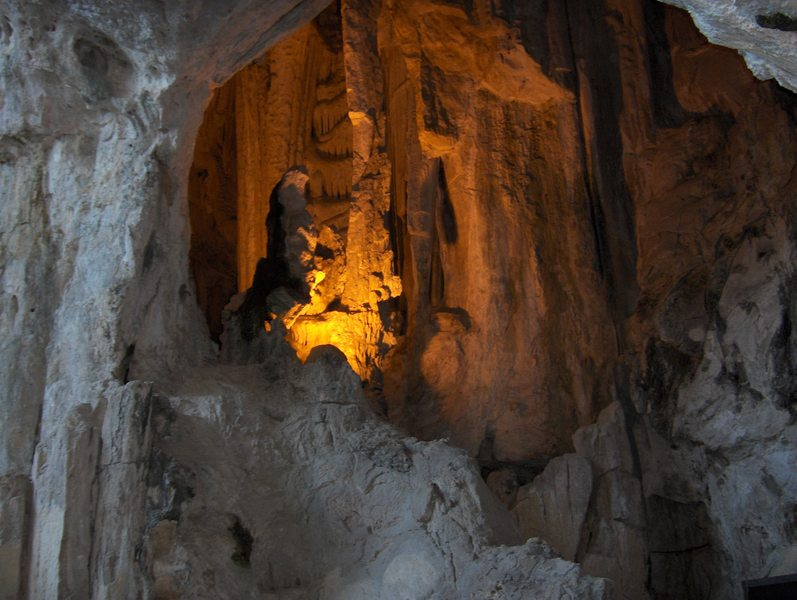
- Interactive map of Grutas de García
- Location: García Municipality, Nuevo León, Mexico
- Coordinates: 25°50′57.6″N 100°31′26″W
- Depth: 105 m (344 ft)
- Length: 3.5 km (2.2 mi)
- Discovery: 1843
- Geology: Limestone
- Entrances: 1
- Access: Aerial Tramway
- Translation: Garcia Caves (Spanish)

Grutas de García (Spanish for 'Garcia Caves') is a cave complex located 9 km (5.6 mi) outside García, Nuevo León in northern Mexico about 30 km (19 mi) from Monterrey. The caves are inside Sierra del Fraile mountain and protected area. The easiest way to reach the entrance to the caves is by taking a five-minute ride on the aerial tramway, but there is a steep path that can be taken to reach the caves.

== History ==
The caves are thought to have formed between 50 and 60 million years ago. During the prehistoric era, the caves were submerged in sea water, and that is the reason marine fossils like sea shells and snail shells can be seen on the cave walls. Grutas de García remained hidden for thousands of years until Fray Juan Antonio de Sobrevilla discovered the caves during a casual excursion through the mountains.

== Structure ==
The caves inside look like a rocky desert landscape with a longitude of 300 meters and 105 meters deep. From the entrance two different paths emerge descending 105 meters: one is about 2.5 kilometers and has 16 different chambers; the other is 1 kilometer long with 11 chambers. Like most caves these maintain a temperature around 18 °C (65 °F).

Inside the caves impressive rock formations are observed that fill the space in the large chambers. There are many interesting stalagmites and stalactites. One of the most spectacular chambers is known as "El salón de la luz" (The Light Chamber) named because of the natural clarity of the rock on the ceiling allowing light from outside to filter through. "La octava maravilla" (The Eighth Wonder) is a formation in the cave where a stalagmite connected with a stalactite to form a column. "El salón del aire" (The Air Chamber) exhibits a balcony that is 40 meters high.

"El mirador de la mano", is a stalagmite that formed a shape that resembles a human hand. There are numerous other fascinating formations as well, including "El Nacimiento" (The Nativity), "La Fuente Congelada" (The Frozen Fountain), "La Torre China" (The Chinese Tower), "El Teatro" (The Theatre), and "El Árbol de Navidad" (The Christmas Tree).

== See also ==
- List of caves in Mexico
