= Corvington =

Corvington is a surname. Notable people with the surname include:

- André Corvington (1877–1918), Haitian fencer
- Georges Corvington (1926–2013), Haitian historian

== See also ==
- Covington (surname)
