= Ella Sophonisba Hergesheimer =

American painter

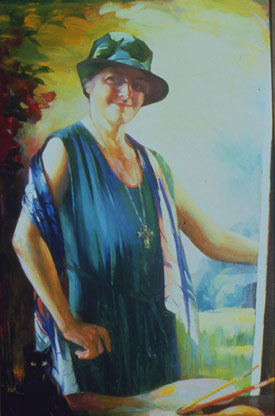
- Self-portrait (1931)
- Born: January 7, 1873; Allentown, Pennsylvania, U.S.
- Died: June 24, 1943 (aged 70); Nashville, Tennessee, U.S.
- Education: Philadelphia School of Design for Women, Pennsylvania Academy of the Fine Arts, Shinnecock Hills Summer School of Art
- Known for: Painting

Ella Sophonisba Hergesheimer (January 7, 1873 – June 24, 1943) was an American illustrator, painter, and printmaker who painted and illustrated Tennessee society and other objects and people, including the state's women and children. As a printmaker, she pioneered the white-line woodcut.

== Early life and education ==
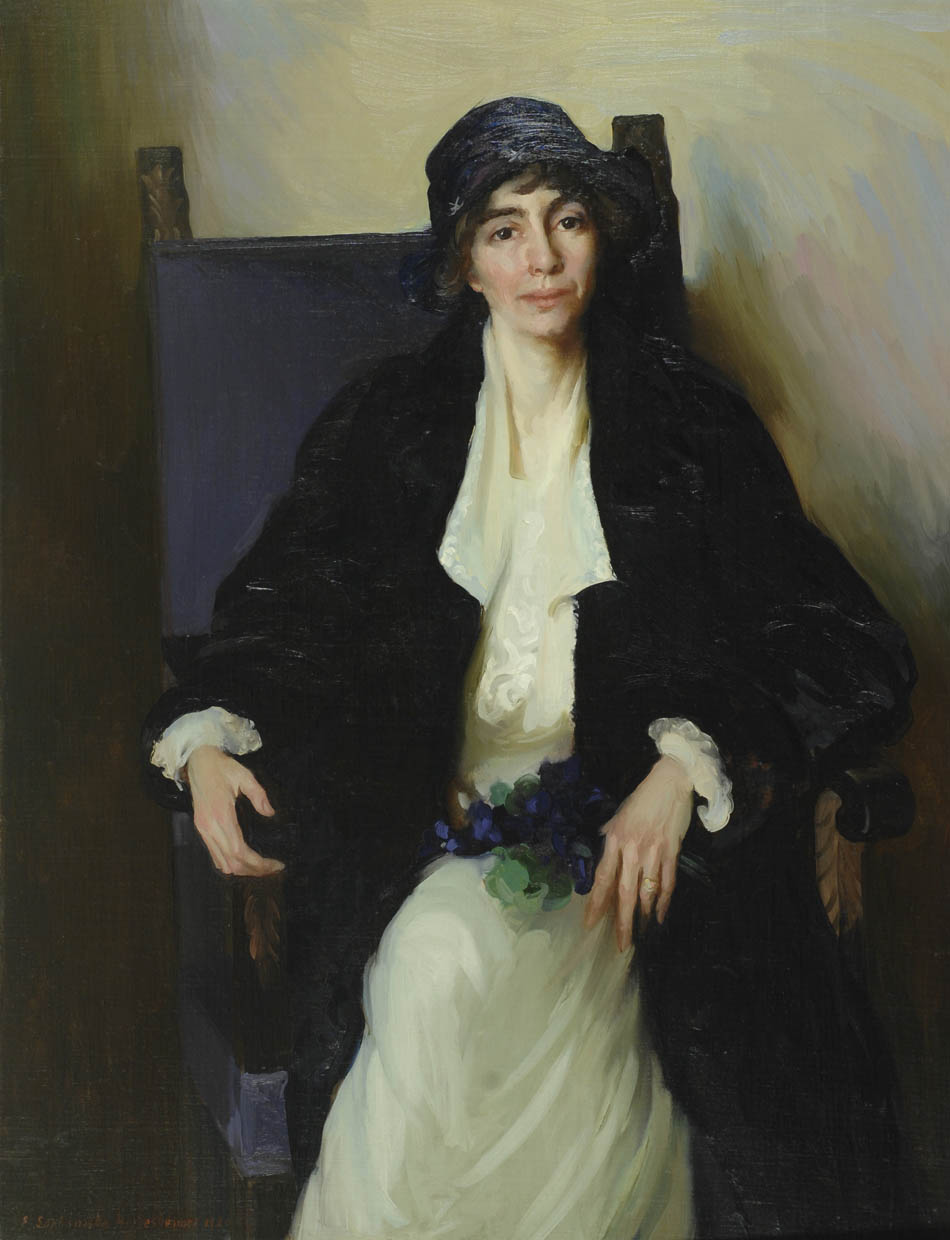
Hergesheimer's 1920 portrait of Madeline McDowell Breckinridge

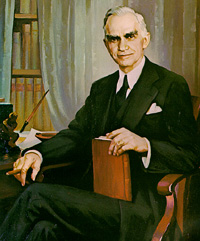
Hergesheimer's 1937 portrait of U.S. Speaker of the House Joseph W. Byrns, Sr., now on display at the United States Capitol

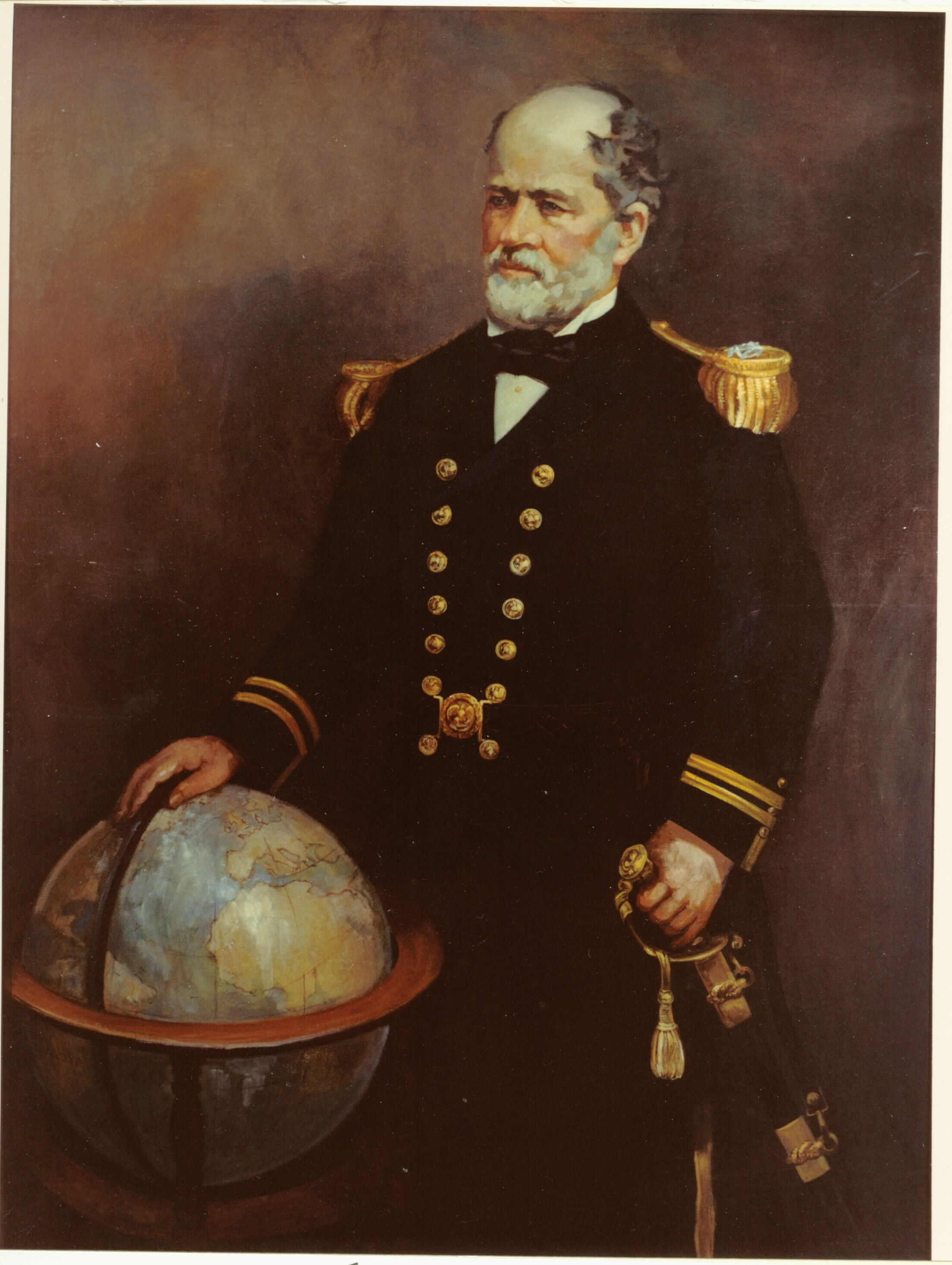
Hergesheimer's portrait of Matthew Fontaine Maury, donated to the United States Naval Academy in Annapolis, Maryland, where it is on display in the Academy's Maury Hall

Hergesheimer was born on January 7, 1873, in Allentown, Pennsylvania, to parents Charles P. Hergesheimer and Ellamanda Ritter Hergesheimer. She was encouraged to create art in her childhood.

Hergesheimer was the great-great granddaughter of Charles Willson Peale, a Philadelphia artist who named one of his daughters Sophonisba after the Italian artist, Sofonisba Anguissola. Hergesheimer chose to use Sophonisba as her first name.

She studied at the Philadelphia School of Design for Women for two years, and then went on to study at the Pennsylvania Academy of Fine Arts for four years. At the Pennsylvania Academy of Fine Arts, she studied with Cecilia Beaux, Hugh Breckenridge, and William Merritt Chase. She was considered by Chase to be one of his finest students, and spent the summer of 1900 studying at Chase's Shinnecock Hills Summer School of Art on Long Island. As a senior at the Pennsylvania Academy of Fine Arts, she was judged the best pupil in her class and was awarded the Cresson Traveling Scholarship.

This allowed her to study abroad in Europe for three years, where she trained at the Académie Colarossi and exhibited at the Paris Salon. She is listed among the students of Blanche Lazzell, who was known for her white-line color woodcuts.

== Career ==
As a result of having her work including in a 1905 traveling exhibition organized by the Nashville Art Association, she received a commission in 1907 to paint the portrait of Holland Nimmons McTyeire, the Methodist bishop who convinced Cornelius Vanderbilt to endow Vanderbilt University. To work on the commission, she relocated to Nashville, Tennessee, where she remained the rest of her life - first occupying a studio on Church Street, and later one at Eighth Avenue and Broadway. She spoke fondly of the region and its residents, stating: "The country around Nashville is, some of it, the most beautiful I have ever seen––a large and bounteous field for the landscape painter. There are hosts of beautiful women and children and strong, fine men to inspire great portraits."

She also conducted art classes in Bowling Green, Kentucky, where her circle of friends included fellow artists Frances Fowler, Sarah Peyton, and Wickliffe Covington. She also maintained a lifelong friendship with landscape painter Orlando Gray Wales, who also was raised in Allentown and also studied at the Pennsylvania Academy of Fine Arts.

Hergesheimer's most notable portraits are those of Speaker of the House Joseph W. Byrns, Sr., which hangs in the United States Capitol building, and of Commodore Matthew Fontaine Maury, which hangs in Maury Hall at the United States Naval Academy in Annapolis, Maryland.

Though portraiture was her primary source of income, Hergesheimer experimented in other painting genres and artistic techniques, including printmaking, which she pursued alongside the artist Blanche Lazzell.

== Death ==
Hergesheimer died on June 24, 1943, in Davidson County, Tennessee.

== Awards ==
- Gold medal, Appalachian Exposition (1910)
- Gold medal, Tennessee State Exposition (1926)

== Major exhibitions ==
- American Artists Professional League
- Art Institute of Chicago
- Corcoran Gallery of Art
- National Academy of Design
- New Orleans Art Association
- Pennsylvania Academy of the Fine Arts
- Salons of America
- Sesquicentennial Exposition, Philadelphia, Pennsylvania (1926)
- Society of Independent Artists

== Colleagues and affiliations ==
- American Artists Professional League
- American Federation of Arts
- National Arts Club
- New Orleans Art Association
- Salons of America
- Society of Independent Artists
- Southern States Art League
- Washington, D.C. Watercolor Club

== Collections ==
Some of the major collectors of Hergesheimer's work are:

- Heckscher Museum of Art, Huntington, New York
- Morris Museum of Art, Augusta, Georgia
- Reading Public Museum, Reading, Pennsylvania
- Tennessee State Museum, Nashville, Tennessee
- United States Capitol, Washington, D.C.
- Vanderbilt University, Nashville, Tennessee
- Two Red Roses Foundation, Palm Harbor, Florida
