= Boca de Potrerillos =

Archaeological site in Mina Municipality, Mexico

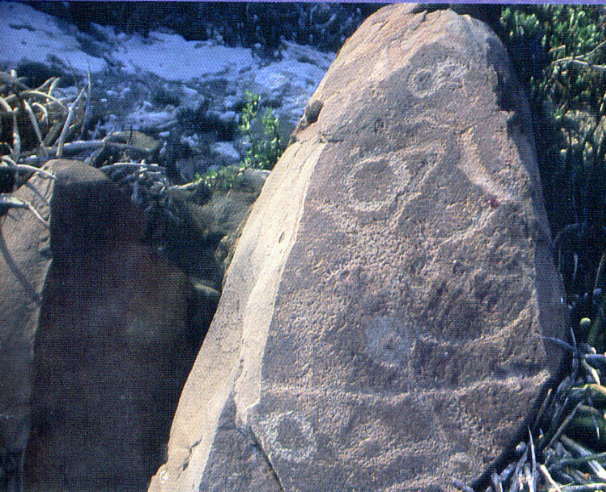
- Petroglypg Vestige, engraved in rock at Boca de Potrerillos
- Interactive map of Boca de Potrerillos
- 25°58′45″N 100°29′38″W
- Type: Rock art
- Location: Nuevo Leon, Mexico

History
- Built: c. 3000 BC

Boca de Potrerillos is an archeological site located some 14 km from the municipal head of Mina, Nuevo León, Mexico. About 60 km north east from Monterrey within the inter-sierra valleys of the Sierra Madre Oriental is the “mouth” or entrance to the Potrerillos Canyon between the Zorra and Antrisco hills. The site covers an area of about 6 km^{2}.

The main feature of this site is containing one of the largest concentrations of rock art in Mexico. Although there are some paintings, the vast majority of works are petroglyphs; there are approximately 3,000 in the área.

== The site ==
The site has been known as Boca Potrerillos since the 19th century because it forms the entrance to the Potrerillos Canyon, being between the El Antrisco and the Zorra Hills. The archaeological vestiges are distributed among three main topographical forms:

a) An extensive alluvial range to the east with hundreds of known pre-Hispanic ovens and thousands of carving stone tools and grinding artifacts scattered on the surface;

b) A second range to the west of the area, containing (though on a smaller scale), the same elements of the eastern range, and

c) The eastern flank of the Antrisco and Zorra hills, where thousands of engraved rocks were found with carvings in one or more of their sides, that makes it one of the most extensive and most important petroglyphs sites in the country.

The Boca de Potrerillos archaeological site is located in a quite inhospitable region today. It dominates a desert landscape with very little or no water sources with the typical vegetation of the area: cactus. However the amount of art embodied in the rocks and studies on the technique, style, etc., in which they were made, suggest a prolonged occupation of human groups at different intervals. Carbon-14 dating testing made on the ovens found in the area as well as oxidation studies of the graphical work and patina indicate that the first human settlement could have been installed here as early as 8900 BC and some of the engravings would be from this period. 1 Archaeologists work has achieved differentiating over 25 plant species in the region, now extinct, evidence that the zone was different and friendlier to humans. The site had some importance at the end of the 18th century as a sugar cane producer; it also had some relevance during the 1910 Mexican Revolution, but after the introduction of cattle to the zone and government efforts to send water from state water wells to the city of Monterrey, the site is more arid than ever before.

=== Site Characteristics ===
The presence of hundreds of pre-Hispanic ovens or furnace stoves, the infinity of stone tools and thousands of rock engraved images commonly known as petroglyphs, evidence the lengthy and important socio economical and ritual development of native groups that exploited and maintained an environmental equilibrium in the region up to the Spaniards' arrival.

The enormous size of the site, the depth of their deposits and the lack of financial resources hampered extensive excavations. However, because of the sedimentation type and climatic conditions in the area, the archaeological ovens, retained coal content inside up till today.

From excavations 20 oven samples were obtained at various depths, which were carbon 14 dated from 6960 BC., up to 1760 AD; this long chronology is an extended sequence of 8,000 years of native cultural development in the northeast region of Mexico.

Samples were taken adjacent to each furnace and milling stones washed to recognize possible vegetal remains through pollen and phytoliths strata identification. It was possible to distinguish over 25 species, indicating the existence of a more humid habitat different from the current desert conditions. Among the vegetal discoveries, some edible items were found such as Typha, Pecan, walnut, tuna, Nopal and mesquite pods. Also discovered other plants requiring a more humid area such as Juncus, aquatic plants, Nettles, and reeds. Other detected species corresponding to trees are Acacia, Willow, holm oak and pine that are no longer found on the site or nearby communities.

Within the ample inventory of stone artifacts rescued and analyzed, the following is an example:

1. A large variety of arrow heads with various shapes, such as wide stalk with round base, triangular simple body, elongated and fin shaped;

2. Scrapers in crescent moon shape, circular and spike, others large of the Clear Fork type, characteristic of 3000 BC;

3. Small plates with incisions as amulets with portable representations of petroglyphs;

4. Grinding stones including grinds and hands, and

5. Unique objects as some ceramic pots locally produced and shell items from the Gulf.

More than 4,000 engraved rocks are known, with an estimated 8 to 10,000 images.

== Inhabitants ==
=== Hunters and semi-nomad collectors ===
A characteristic of this and other cave painting places in northeastern Mexico is the lack of ethnic-historical references. Spanish colonial authors wrote many details about the art and work of Mesoamerican native groups, but there were few detailed descriptions for native groups of northeastern New Spain a large sparsely populated area before European settlements, also they are very frugal in describing the lives and ways of the region inhabitants. Captain Alonso de León, was the first colonial author who made a complete description about the Native American groups in the region, their lives and customs, Alonso depicted them as barbaric semi-nomad groups divided in numerous subgroups with no dominant culture. It makes it difficult to determine which group or groups took part in the implementation of the Boca de Potrerillos petroglyphs. However recent archaeological work by authors such as William B. Murray, Solveig A. Turpin, Herbert H. Eling Jr., and others have provided understanding of the cave art and artists at Boca de Potrerillos.

For the Nahuatl speaking Aztec society the groups living in what is now northern Mexico and Southwestern United States were called Chichimec's (an insult in Nahuatl) in referring to them as savages. Upon contact with Spaniards in the region towards the end of the 16th century, initial sources identified over 200 native groups dedicated primarily to hunting and fruit recollection. Within their nomad life these groups had a more or less regular itinerary throughout the year and went back to centers such as Boca de Potrerillos when the weather and times favor these activities.

Both, by its untamed nature, as well as for references to them as Chichimec by the Nahuatl dominant group, the native groups, in colonial sources, are described as barbarians and uncultivated, very different from the cultivated groups of Mesoamerica. It is not known, even once of cave art work references in colonial sources. By the end of the 18th century any native trace had already disappeared.

=== The artists ===
It is believed that the groups occupying the zone were a branch of a larger group known by archeologists as Coahuilteco that inhabited the slopes of the Sierra Madre Oriental up to the southwest Texas in the lower Pecos River. Without excluding other groups, related or not, that might have taken part in making the petroglyphs.

As shown in the following petroglyphs styles categorization, the question of authorship of many of them is a matter being analyzed and remains unresolved.

== The Art Work ==
The artistic work of Boca de Potrerillos could split in two: the parietal work and portable art work. Art embodied in the walls or rocky shelters are overwhelmingly abundant compared with physical art of Boca de Potrerillos, however its study and analysis complements the style interpretation and purpose of the work in general.

=== Parietal Art ===
For the art study imprinted in the large rocks, anthropologists have divided the Boca de Potrerillos into four sections: North Slope, southern slope, the promontory and hidden Valley hidden on a slit of the North Slope. These four sections contain approximately 3,000 petroglyphs with different execution and style techniques. The largest number of these prints is on the northern slopes and facing east, which hints at a purpose of astronomical observation.

==== Style ====
Designs outlined in these rocks are generally abstract. Anthropologist William B. Murray classifies the engravings in 5 categories:

1. The most recent: angular geometric that resembles cattle stamps. Could have been made by Europeans emulating native traditions by the Apaches and Comanche’s that attacked Mina (Nuevo León) between 1830 and 1850.
2. The engravings of this style appear fresh and recent. Intermediate age symbols similar to those associated with puberty ceremonies in California y Nevada tribes: diamonds, net shaped artifacts (rattle snake), etc. The Fierce Thornapple ceremony for boys and girls is mentioned in colonial sources corroborating the meaning possibility of these figures. These are Coahuilteco symbols similar to other regions, but are limited to a Boca certain area and are not the most common.
3. The majority are classical abstract geometrical tradition of the Great Basin. Identified with the Desert Archaic Culture. The technique used is chopping and shaping by circular/undulated incisions. Styles can be of different ages. The authorship of the symbols is not resolved.
4. Solid figure style. Rare at Boca, but abundant in other places of the region. Sometimes representing projectile points. One of them, Shumla, is associated with the mid to late Archaic Period.
5. Hole and Groove Style, similar to the one found in Diegueño, California with wavy lines that follow the contours of the rock and the other with dots rows arranged in complex grids

==== Purpose ====
Archaeologists are discerning about the purpose of cave art in Boca de Potrerillos. Following their reflection the meaning and purpose of the cave designs is in sight. Some of these are as follows:

- a. The parietal art discovers an educational and public intention with regard to engravings on the slopes and areas exposed for all to see.
- b. A ritual sense is expressed by topic repetition.
- c. Murray considers and prepares the possibility that some of the Boca engravings have an astronomical purpose. The arrangement of some of them leads him to consider a calendar intention that seeks to be a temporary guidance to determine suitable times of the year for hunter gatherer (activities common to these groups). He proposes the following hypothesis: the area called promontory functioned as solar and celestial observatory from which sunrise's positions over the hillside could be contemplated, perhaps using the remote peaks as additional indicators. From the promontory is a good line of sight in all directions.
- d. Other authors such as Moisés Valadez, Solveig A. Turpin and Herbert H. Eling, supported on recent theories that figures resulting in rock art have a physiological origin derived generally from trance experiences often caused by consumption of hallucinogens such as Peyote, link Boca de Potrerillos art with Shamanism activities.

=== Portable Art ===
The density of prehistoric domestic waste confirms that the area was able to sustain a relatively large population. Research that started in 1990 has discovered even early prehistoric pottery, the first architectural relics and portable art. The analyzed furnaces and Carbon-14 testing indicate that the site has intermittently been occupied for at least 7,800 years or more.

==== Style ====
Archaeologists Moisés Valadez, Solveig A. Turpin and Herbert H. Eling propose for the Boca de Potrerillos portable art two styles, designating them by the name of the place they were found.

- 1. Stones from “Cóconos Ranch”, with designs identified as “rain”, “flower”, “butterfly”, “eye lock” and “hook”. From testing applied to furnaces remains and tools found next to these rocks, even though an absolute date cannot be assigned, it is considered to be some 5,000 years old.

Stones from Loma de San Pedro. Show intersecting incisions, generally triangular or wedge-shaped stones. The antiquity of these pieces is estimated between 230 and 950 years.

==== Purposes ====
Portable art found in prehistoric surroundings has its own digression ways. Some interpret objects markings (stones, bones, etc.) as counting systems. The possibility has been considered that these objects are ornamental or are "toys, hunting game, mortuary offerings, divination instruments, Mnemotechnics artifacts, menstruation fetishis, Puberty or fertility amulets or a healing Talisman”. It is difficult to establish the meaning and purposes of these portable pieces as are the first found in the state of Nuevo León, but can be analogy compared with portable art found in the lower Pecos River (Texas) and the North American Great Basin.

The nature of portable art is personal as opposed to parietal art that is public. For this reason the first type hints at a private use. The motifs, although in some cases appear in both types of art, vary and themes interpreted as "Butterfly" in representation a Vulva, do not appear in public art.

== Boca de Potrerillos, astronomical observatory 7,000 years ago. ==
Archaeologist Denise Carpinteyro Espinosa, from National Institute of anthropology and history, Center INAH, reports that petroglyphs (engraved stone) in the site, some are related to astronomy while others are more closely related to everyday life of these hunter-gatherers human groups who inhabited this site 7 thousand years ago. The site is crossed by a river and it is inferred that this site was of great importance for diverse human occupations during over 7,000 years. Boca de Potrerillos, we very ancient settlements. The level of engravings offers a significant knowledge level of the skies and studies that have been made on the handling time for hunting which was related to the stars or for many everyday things of life.

== Identification and Register Grid System ==
Developed in 2005, specifically for Boca de Potrerillos, has rapidly demonstrated its effectiveness as over 4,000 rock engravings have since been already registered. The system is based on a GPS map divided in grids. Over 600 hectares of the Boca de Potrerillos polygon are identified on a digital master grid that contains location of every rock, which is then recreated in three dimensions, using high definition digital photos. With the support of the Texas University, USA, petroglyph dating studies have been made by the Carbon 14 method which provide a total of 20 epochs, of which the oldest is 8,000 years. With this information the site complete chronology was developed and it was determined that the site apogee occurred 4,000 years ago.

== See also ==
- Chiquihuitillos
- Cueva Ahumada

== Bibliography ==
- Günter Berghaus (2004). New perspectives on prehistoric art, Günter Berhaus. ISBN 0-275-97813-3, ISBN 978-0-275-97813-6.
- Murray, William B. (1987). Arte rupestre en Nuevo León: numeración prehistórica, Gobierno del Estado de Nuevo León Secretaría de Administración. Archivo General del Estado.
- Murray, William B. (2007). Arte rupestre del noreste, Fondo Editorial de NL. ISBN 970-9715-24-0, ISBN 978-970-9715-24-8.
- Murray, William B. (1982). «Art and Site Environment at Boca de Potrerillos, Nuevo León, México». American Indian Rock Art (7–8): pp. 57–68.
- Rebolloso, Roberto (1991). Arqueología de Nuevo León, Archivo General del Estado de Nuevo León.
- Turpin, Solveing; Eling, Herbert H; Valadez Moreno, Moisés (1993). «From Marshland to Desert: The Late Prehistoric Environment of Boca de Potrerillos, Nuevo León, México». North American Archeologist (14:4).
- Turpin, Solveing; Eling, Herbert H; Valadez Moreno, Moisés (1994). «Archaic Environment of Boca de Potrerillos, Northeastern Mexico». North American Archeologist (15:4): pp. 331–357.
- Turpin, Solveing; Eling, Herbert H; Valadez Moreno, Moisés (1995). «Boca de Potrerillos, Nuevo Leon: Adaptacion prehispánica a las áridas del noreste de México en Arqueología del Occidente y Norte de México». El Colegio de Michoacán (Eduardo Williams and Phil C. Weigand): pp. 177–224.
- Valadez Moreno, Moisés (1998). Boca de Potrerillos, Universidad Autonoma de Nuevo León. ISBN 968-7808-21-7, ISBN 978-968-7808-21-5.
- Valadez Moreno, Moisés (1999). La arqueología de Nuevo León y el noroeste, Universidad Autónoma de Nuevo León. ISBN 968-7808-75-6, ISBN 978-968-7808-75-8.
