= Frances Fowler =

American painter

- Born: June 1864; Bowling Green, Kentucky
- Died: June 5, 1943 (aged 78–79); Bowling Green, Kentucky
- Education: Ella Sophonisba Hergesheimer
- Known for: Painting

Frances Fowler (June 1864 – June 5, 1943) was an American painter, notable as a student of Ella Sophonisba Hergesheimer. The daughter of F.C. and Harriett (Reese) Herrick, she studied at Vanderbilt University before marrying Edward Fowler, a Columbia, Tennessee judge in 1895. After his death in 1908, she returned to Bowling Green to study with Hergesheimer. She traveled extensively throughout England and Italy to study art. She died in Bowling Green in 1943.
