= Freetown Sibun =

Coordinates: 17°25′N 88°21′W

Freetown Sibun is a populated settlement located in the nation of Belize. It is a mainland village that is located in Belize District along the Sibun River.

== Demographics ==
At the time of the 2010 census, Freetown Sibun had a population of 78. Of these, 51.3% were Creole, 42.3% Mestizo, 6.4% Mixed and 1.3% Ketchi Maya.
