= Joljaʼ =

Mayan archaeological site in Mexico

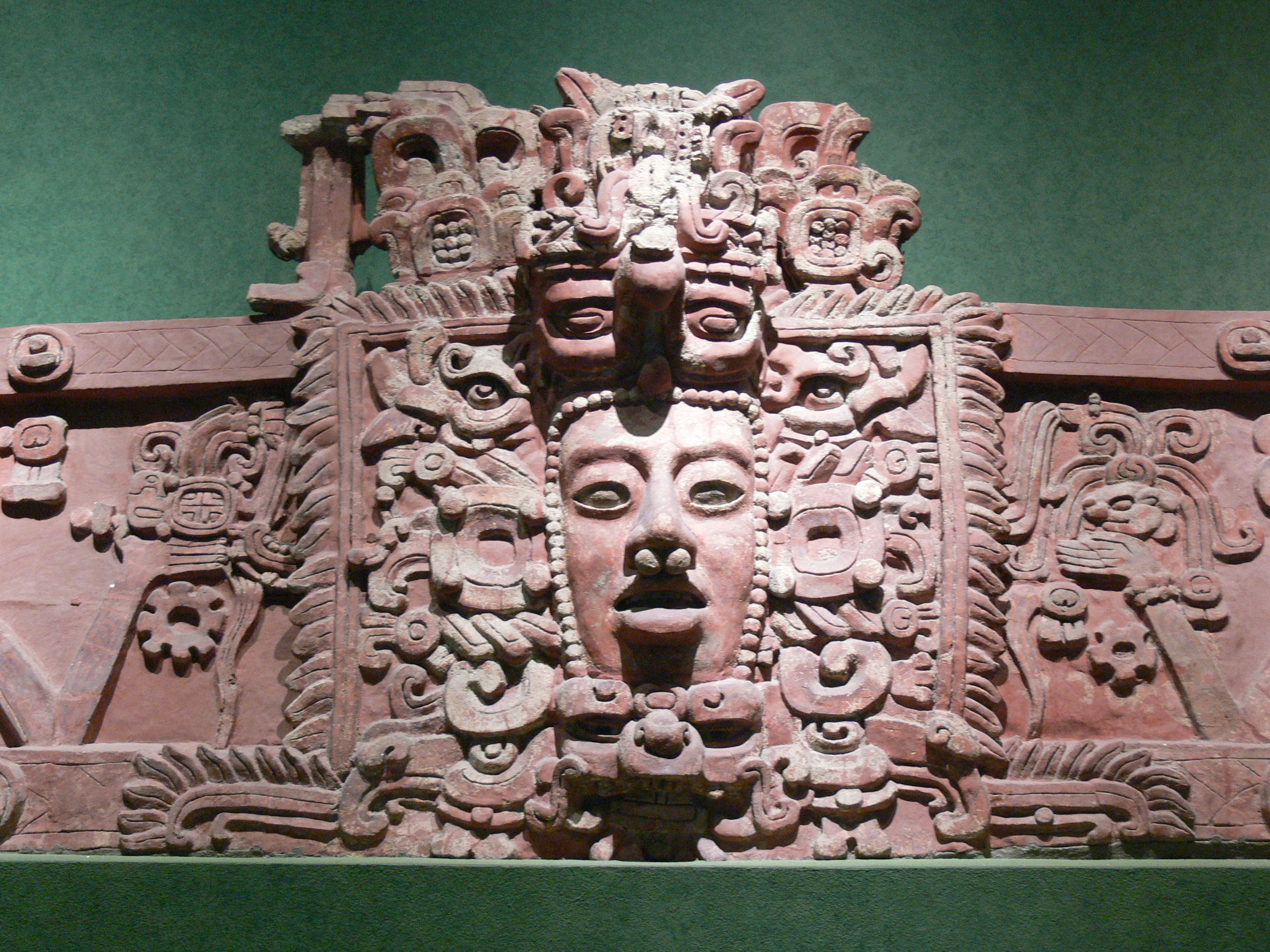

Joljaʼ is an archaeological site of the pre-Columbian Mayan civilization, located in the Chiapas highlands of central southern Mexico. Also known as Cueva de Jolja' (or Jolja) in Spanish, the site is a cave which contains a painted mural and a number of inscriptions in the Mayan script which date back to the Early Classic period (ca. 3rd to 7th centuries AD).

== Overview ==
The name joljaʼ is from the Chʼol language, one of the Mayan languages, meaning "at the head of the water", referring to it being the source of the headwaters of the Ixtelja River, which emerge from the mouth of one of the three interconnected caves to flow down a steep escarpment on the eastern side of Misopaʼ Mountain to the valley below. The three caves are collectively referred to as "Cueva de Joljaʼ" by the local Chʼol Mayan inhabitants. The highest and drier of these containing the inscriptions and other evidence of use in pre-Columbian times.

The Maya performed rituals in many caves and left behind many artifacts. Though there are many such caves in the area, few of them have been found to contain murals or hieroglyphic writing.

The cave is still used today by the local Chʼol Mayan of the nearby Joloniel community for their Day of the Cross ceremonies.

The main Joljaʼ cave contains one mural with accompanying inscriptions as well as at least five other groups of inscriptions. It was common for Mayan elites to wear quetzal feather headdresses. The Ajaw sign appears above two of the figures depicted in the mural. There are several dates that are present at Joljaʼ Cave. These dates are a part of the Mesoamerican Long Count calendar. The Long Count calendar is divided into units of 360 days called tuns. Major ceremonies were held at the end of every katun or 20 tuns.

The Day of the Cross ceremonies are conducted at Jolja cave on May 3. This is a Catholic festival, but there are aspects of pre-Columbian rain rituals incorporated in them, because May 3 is the start of the rainy season.

== See also ==
- Maya cave sites
