= Oxtotitlán =

Rock shelter and archaeological site in Mexico

- Cueva de Oxtotitlán
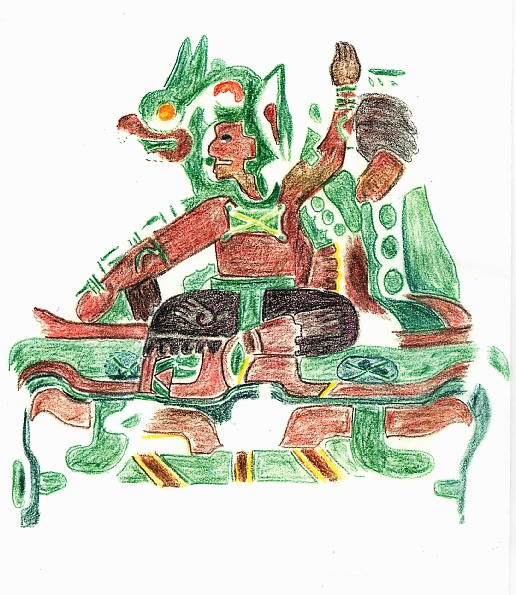
- enthroned ruler wearing what has been identified as an owl costume (Mural 1 artist rendition)

- location in Mexico Location in Guerrero
- 17°47′N 98°57′W
- Type: rock shelter
- Periods: Mesoamerican Preclassical, Approx. 900 years BCE
- Cultures: Olmec
- Location: Chilapa de Álvarez, Guerrero

Oxtotitlán in relation to the major Formative Era sites showing Olmec influences in the archaeological record.

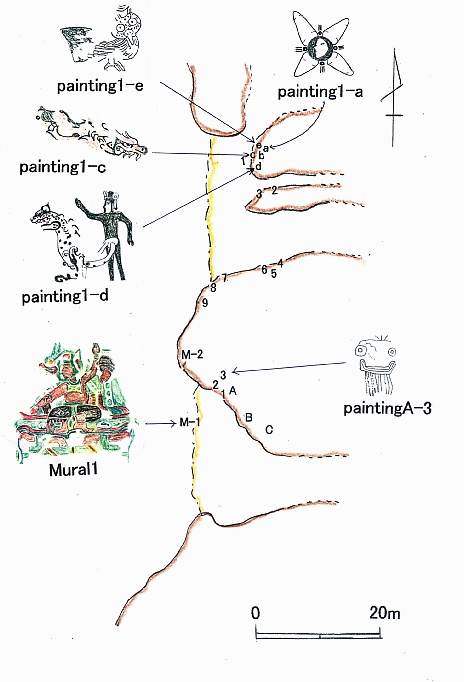
A plan of the Oxtotitlán grottos, showing the locations of the various paintings. The yellow lines represent the grotto entrances, while the brown lines show grotto walls.

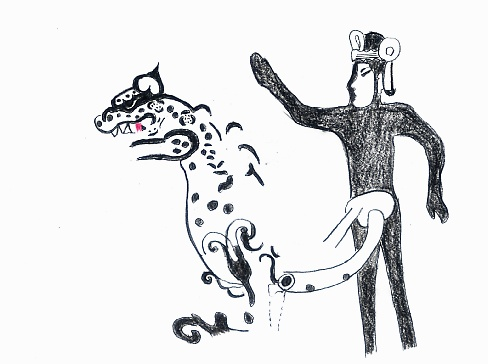
An artist's rendition of painting 1-D, showing the outline of a ruler and rearing jaguar.

Oxtotitlán is a natural rock shelter and archaeological site in Chilapa de Álvarez, Mexican state of Guerrero that contains murals linked to the Olmec motifs and iconography. Along with the nearby Juxtlahuaca cave, the Oxtotitlán rock paintings represent the "earliest sophisticated painted art known in Mesoamerica", thus far. Unlike Juxtlahuaca, however, the Oxtotitlán paintings are not deep in a cave system but rather occupy two shallow grottos on a cliff face.

The paintings have been variously dated to perhaps 900 years BCE. It is not known what group or society painted them. It is also not known how Olmec-influenced art came to be painted hundreds of kilometers (or miles) from the Olmec heartland, although caves are prominent on many Olmec-style monuments, including La Venta Altars 4 and 5.

== Description ==
The Paintings cover an area of about 200 m^{2} (2,200 sq ft) There is restoration work in 10 walls, it is expected to complete scientific investigation and establish the origin of the paints used in the designs.

The best-known samples of Oxtotitlán paintings are those part of the core group. These are two Polychrome murals, one of which represent a sitting character on a mythological Olmec serpent, wearing a mask, according to Grove, could be a representation of an Owl. The other mural of the central group has been severely damaged by time and the environment, making it difficult to identify. Internal murals are monochrome (black and white), or bi-chromos, combining elements of red and black.

Unlike Juxtlahuaca, it is possible that Oxtotitlán contained a housing area, because ceramic materials have been found in the vicinity of the Quiotepec Hill.

== Distribution ==
The paintings are distributed in three areas with a separate type of painting assigned to each area.

=== North grotto ===
The paintings are smaller, were created using black pigment, and feature animals, humans, and legendary creatures.

=== South grotto ===
The paintings here, by contrast, are in red and generally feature geometric designs.

=== Central grotto ===
Between the north and south grottos are two large polychrome murals, over the cave entrance.

== The Murals ==
=== Mural 1 ===
This Mural is situated above the mouth to the south grotto, and portrays what is most likely a ruler seated upon a throne similar to La Venta's Altar 4 or 5. The eyes of a primal cave monster, showing Olmec iconic crossed-bars, can be seen on the top edge of the throne (note that the ruler is also wearing a crossed-bars pectoral, perhaps linking him directly with the monster). The ruler, painted in vibrant reds, greens, and browns, is wearing a bird mask, generally identified as that of an owl, as well as a green-feathered costume. Seated on the throne, his left leg is tucked underneath him while the right dangles down, similar to a pose found on the fragmentary Laguna de los Cerros Monument 9.

=== Mural 2 ===
This Mural, at 3 by 2 m (9.8 by 6.6 ft), is even larger than Mural 1 but this exposed painting has been largely worn away over the intervening millennia and is now almost impossible to recognize.

It seems to picture a human in jaguar clothing or otherwise associated with a jaguar.

Also of particular note is the north grotto's "most striking creation", Painting 1-D, which features an ithyphallic man standing behind what appears to be a rearing jaguar. The man is painted in black outline, with a headdress. His exaggerated genitals that point to the jaguar have led to speculation that this is a scene of a man copulating with a jaguar, but more likely the jaguar is the ruler's spiritual co-essence, later known in Classic Maya culture as a way spirit.

== Preservation and visitation ==
In the 30 years following its re-discovery, the site was the object of graffiti and poor maintenance. This was addressed in the 2002 by the restoration work of Sandra Cruz, under the auspices of the National Coordination of Conservation of the Cultural Patrimony, INAH-Churubusco.

Although the paintings can still be viewed, visitors must first register with the local caretakers in the nearby village of Acatlán.

== See also ==
- Juxtlahuaca
- List of caves in Mexico
- Maya cave sites
