= Covington High School =

Covington High School is the name of several high schools in the United States:

- Covington High School (Covington, Indiana)
- Covington High School (Covington, Louisiana)
- Covington High School (Covington, Ohio)
- Covington High School (Covington, Tennessee)
- Covington High School (Covington, Texas)
- Covington High School (Covington, Virginia)
- Covington Catholic High School (Park Hills, Kentucky)

== See also ==
- Holmes Junior/Senior High School (Covington, Kentucky), originally Covington Central High
