= Wickliffe Covington =

American artist (1867–1938)

- Born: Mary Wickliffe Cooper; July 2, 1867; Shelby County, Kentucky, US
- Died: December 1, 1938 (aged 71); Bowling Green, Kentucky, US
- Education: Art Students League of New York and Ella Sophonisba Hergesheimer, William Merritt Chase
- Known for: Painting

Wickliffe Cooper Covington (July 2, 1867 – December 1, 1938) was an American painter. She was active in Kentucky and California.

== Early life ==
Wickliffe Cooper Covington was the daughter of Robert Wickliffe Cooper and Sarah Steele (Venable) Cooper. Her father died a few weeks before she was born, so she never knew him. Her father had been a Union Army cavalry officer during the Civil War.

== Education ==
She studied at Sayre Female Institute, the New England Conservatory of Music and the Art Students League of New York. She also studied art with Ella Sophonisba Hergesheimer — with whom she would remain a close friend — James Carroll Beckwith, Kenyon Cox, William Merritt Chase and Wayman Elbridge Adams.

== Career ==
Covington exhibited at the 1904 World's Fair in St. Louis.

She taught art at Potter College for Young Ladies in Bowling Green, Kentucky. After that, she painted and taught art in a studio in a cabin that she renovated that was near her residence.

Along with noted artists, such as William Merritt Chase and photographer Ansel Adams, Covington was an artist and resident of the Carmel art colony. Her first recorded visit was during the spring and summer of 1911, when she exhibited "tooled leather" at the Annual of the Carmel Arts and Crafts Club. She purchased a studio-home, continued as a regular seasonal resident with her husband, and exhibited on the Pacific coast with the Monterey County Fair, Santa Cruz Art League, and Carmel Art Association until 1937. She also exhibited her art in the southern United States.

Her painting Portrait of Clarence Underwood McElroy is in the Kentucky Museum collection of the Western Kentucky University. About 1895 she made a portrait of Judge Robert William Wells (1795–1864) of Missouri. In addition to the paintings that she made of notable Bowling Green residents, she also painted still lifes and flowers. She made a poster Aunt Jane of Kentucky, which was used to promote Eliza Calvert Hall's daughter's teahouse business.

Her works were exhibited in 2001 at the Kentucky Women Artists, 1850-1970 show at the Kentucky Library & Museum, Owensboro Museum of Art.

== Personal life ==
On May 18, 1892, she married Robert Wells Covington, who had his Bachelor of Law degree and then worked in farming. They had four children, all born in Kentucky: son Euclid, daughter Margaret, daughter Wickliffe, and son Wells. The Covingtons also had a home in Carmel, California.

She died in Bowling Green on December 1, 1938.
