= Covington County =

Covington County is the name of a couple of counties in the United States:

- Covington County, Alabama
- Covington County, Mississippi
