= Sistema Cheve =

Cave in Oaxaca, Mexico

- Interactive map of Sistema Cheve
- Location: Sierra Juárez, Oaxaca, Mexico
- Coordinates: 17.864336°N 96.794342°W
- Dimensions: 1,538 metres (5,046 ft) deep. 96.1 kilometres (59.7 mi) total length.

Sistema Cheve (/ˈtʃeɪveɪ/ CHEV-ay; Spanish: Cueva Cheve, Sistema Cheve) is a deep cave in the Sierra Juárez mountain range in the southern Mexican state of Oaxaca. As of June 2023, its deepest point has been measured at 1,529 metres (5,016 ft) deep. This makes it the second-deepest known cavern in Mexico and the Americas, as well as the world's 11th-deepest cave. More than 55 miles (89 km) of passageways have been mapped within the cave.

As of 2021, the present limit of exploration in Cheve, at 11.77 kilometres (7.31 mi) from the nearest entrance, represents one of the most remote locations ever attained inside any cave on Earth. The logistics of reaching this point are enormous: more than two kilometers of rope need to be rigged and seven underground camps established. Cheve is the deepest proven freshwater hydrological system in the world. Temperatures in Cheve are moderate, ranging from 8 to 11 °C (46 to 52 °F). It has been most thoroughly explored under the leadership of caver Bill Stone.

== Exploration history ==
In modern times, Cheve was discovered in the mid-1980s by Bill Farr and Carol Vesely. Since then it has been pushed to a depth of 1,529 metres (5,016 ft), making it the second-deepest cave in the Americas. As of 2015 the cave system had the greatest proven depth potential in the world as proven by a dye trace from its main entrance to a resurgence 2,547 metres (8,356 ft) lower. The terminus of the main Cheve system is a large breakdown pile reached after diving through two sumps. It is just over 9 kilometres (5.6 miles) from the entrance, making it one of the most remote underground locations on Earth. Due to the logistical difficulties of continuing exploration from this point, expeditions are focusing on finding mid-way entrances that might provide a quicker route into the middle Cheve system.

On March 1, 1991, Indiana caver Christopher Yeager made a fatal mistake while rappelling the 23-metre (75 ft) drop in Cheve. Eleven days after the accident, Yeager was buried in a passage near where he fell. On February 8, 1992, almost a year after his death, a team of Yeager's caving friends (a team of Polish climbers) used ropes and pulleys to pull his body to the surface, after which it was returned to his family in Indiana.

In 2004, an international caving expedition led by the U.S. Deep Caving Team discovered a new cave they named J2. The entrance of J2 is five kilometres (3 mi) northeast of the Cheve entrance. J2 appears to head in the direction of Cheve Cave, with a predicted intersection beyond the tunnel collapse that stopped the team in 2003. Current expeditions are underway to find a connection between J2 and Cheve Cave, which would produce a cave system more than 2 kilometres (6,600 ft) in depth. The integration of the entire system would produce a 2,597-metre-deep (8,520 ft) cave and would be the deepest known cave in the world.

During the years 2017, 2018, and 2019, the known extent of Cheve Cave reached 55 kilometres (34 miles) in length and a depth of 1,524 metres (5,000 ft) compared to the Palomitas cave entrance.

In 2021, an entire new section of the cave was discovered, increasing its known length to 76,735 metres (251,755 ft) and its depth to 1,536 metres (5,039 ft).

The 2022 National Geographic TV film "Explorer: the Deepest Cave" documents the further exploration of the cave in 2021 as it was taking place by Bill Stone and a large team. The exploration team discovered that the cave appeared to end in a terminal sump. An expedition is planned for the spring of 2026 to dive the sump.

== Archaeology ==
Pre-Hispanic peoples used Cheve Cave for their ceremonial practices. In the Cuicatec region, most beliefs focus on a mystical figure called Señor del Cerro ("Lord of the Hill"), who is said to dwell in Cheve and cure souls. Numerous Cuicatec artifacts have been found within its passages. On January 24 and 25, 1988, the Cheve Archaeological Project (CAP) led by American archaeologist Janet Fitzsimmons in cooperation with archaeologists from the Instituto Nacional de Antropología e Historia (INAH) Oaxaca division, explored, recorded, and mapped portions of the cave. They discovered impressive jade beads, a wooden mask, in-situ vessels, buried human remains, and obsidian blades, believed to have been used in bloodletting ceremonies. The greatest find of the survey was a turquoise mosaic tablet that was discovered in Chamber 1 of the cave, named the Cueva Cheve Tablet. The tablet dates to the Late Postclassic Period (1250–1500 AD). One quadrant pattern includes a battle scene with winners and losers. The cave was also likely used from the Classic Period (250–750 AD), and evidence that the cave continues to be used ceremonially today by the local Cuicatecs. In the spring of 1990 and 1991, three archaeological chambers in the cave were excavated by a team of speleologists and archaeologists from the Instituto Nacional de Antropología e Historia (INAH). Cheve quickly gained notoriety as the deepest cave in the Americas and foot traffic to the cave increased significantly. A decision was made to take the artifacts to the Oaxaca Regional Museum of INAH so that they would not be looted and to prevent further humidity damage.

== See also ==
- Krubera Cave
- List of Caves
- List of caves in Mexico
- List of deepest caves
