= Loltun Cave =

Coordinates: 20°15′10″N 89°27′23″W

Loltun Cave is a cave in the Yucatán, approximately 7 km (4.3 mi) south of Oxkutzcab. The cave contains paintings attributed to the Maya civilization from the Late Preclassic Era or even older. The name is Mayan for "Flower Stone" ("Lol-Tun").

== History ==
This cave is about two kilometers in length. Inside Loltún there is evidence confirming early human occupation, as well as the bones of mammoth, bison, sabre tooth tiger and deer remains from the Pleistocene, On the walls you can observe natural formations and paintings, human hands and faces, sculptural representations, representations of animals and geometric shapes. Tools and pottery were also recovered.

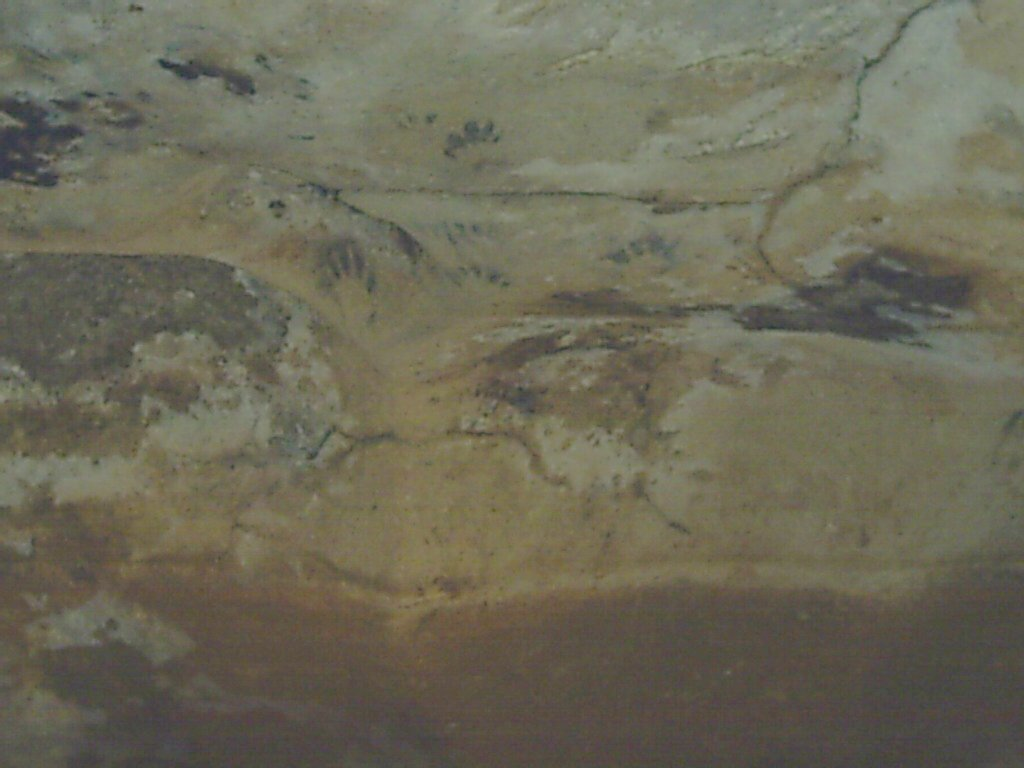
Cave paintings from Lol-Tun, Yucatán

The prehispanic Maya also used the cave as shelter and used to extract the clay to make their ceramics The tour offers visits to the galleries and natural formations known locally as the room of musical columns, a vault known as the cathedral, jaltunes, Grand Canyon, corn cob, the infant, black hand paintings, the room of stalactites and trenches. The Huechil cavity was excavated where they found remains of extinct fauna such as mammoth bones and vegetation different from today. The occupation in Loltún goes back more than 10,000 years and served as a hiding place during the Caste War.

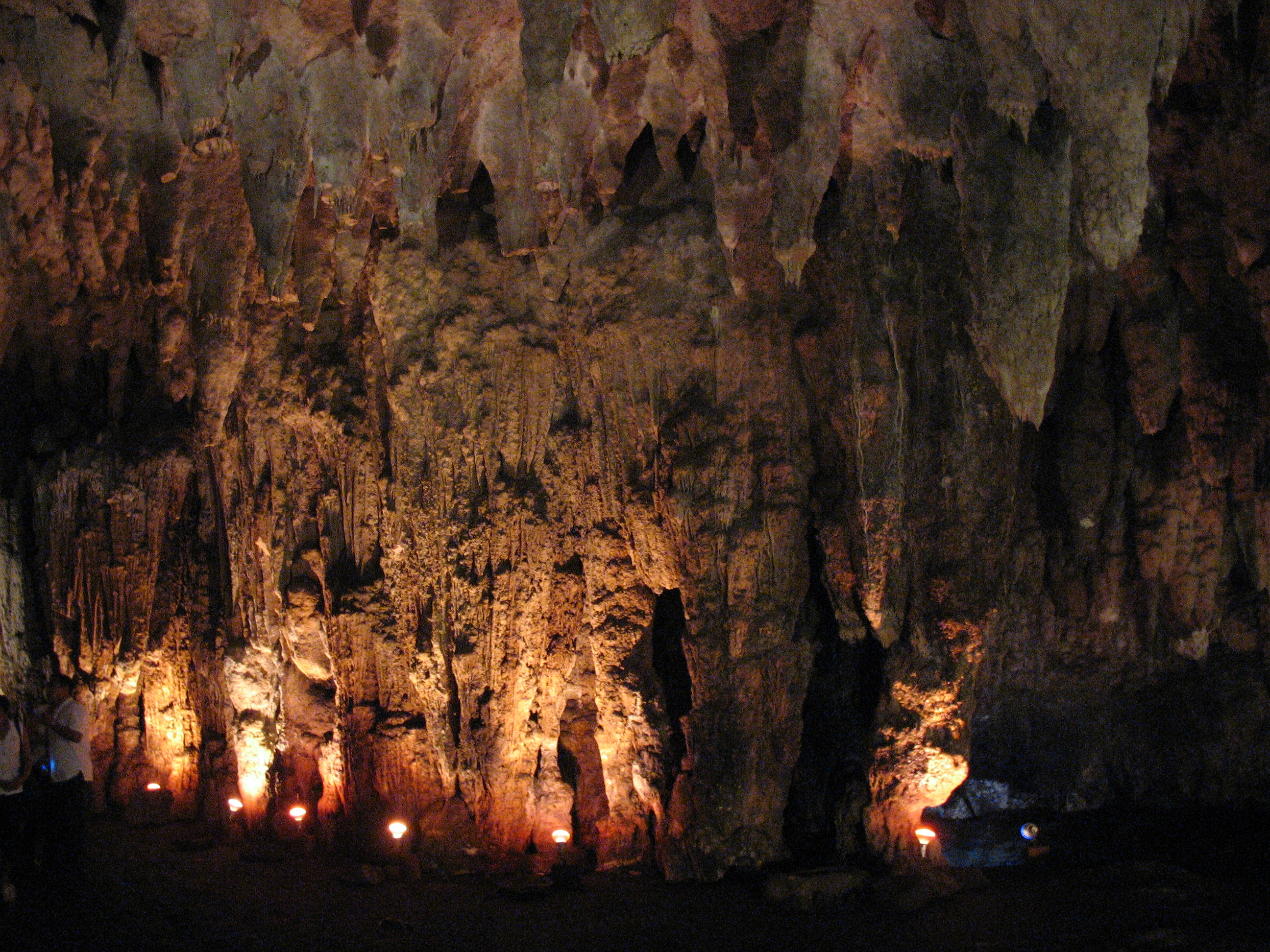
Lol-Tun, Yucatán

== Location ==
It is located 110 kilometers southwest of Mérida. It is 7 km south of the town of Oxkutzcab.

== See also ==
- Maya cave sites
