= William Wallace Covington =

American forester

William Wallace (Wally) Covington (1947, Oklahoma) is an Emeritus Regents' Professor of Forest Ecology at Northern Arizona University (NAU), and the Emeritus Founding Director of the Ecological Restoration Institute at NAU. Covington is known for his research and outreach activities on conservation, forest health, fire ecology, and ecological restoration, drawn from his research since 1970 on the ponderosa pine, aspen, dry mixed conifer, and pinyon-juniper forests and woodlands of the West, particularly those that surround Flagstaff, Arizona. He has been called perhaps the nation's most visible forest scientist, by Science magazine.

== Biography ==
Covington spent his youth in Oklahoma and Texas. His father, who died when Covington was young, instilled in his son a love and respect of nature. They spent every other weekend out of doors, living off the land. He also introduced his son to the teachings of restoration pioneer Aldo Leopold, who became a major influence on Covington. Covington's mother was a schoolteacher, and encouraged his scholastic nature. Covington excelled at school, and received his B.A. (honors) in Biology at the University of North Texas in 1969. He enrolled directly in medical school, with the intention of studying pediatric oncology. The emotional nature of the work took its toll, however, and he took a year's leave to teach school in Gallup, New Mexico. He never returned to medical school. Instead, inspired by ecology classes taken as an undergraduate, he enrolled in the graduate program at the University of New Mexico, where he earned an M.S. in ecology in 1972. Covington continued on to earn a Master of Forestry in 1974 and a Ph.D. in 1976 from Yale University's School of Forestry and Environmental Studies, where Leopold studied. Covington joined the faculty at Northern Arizona University in 1975, and began researching the ponderosa pine forests in the area. In 1996 Covington became the founder and director of the new Ecological Restoration Program, established with funding provided by the Arizona legislature to NAU. Researchers from the program began to work with land managers to design, implement, and monitor restoration treatments at a variety of sites in the West. In 2004 Congress passed PL 108-317 establishing the Ecological Restoration Institute (ERI) at NAU and sister institutes in Colorado (the Colorado Forest Restoration Institute at Colorado State University) and New Mexico (the New Mexico Forest and Watershed Restoration Institute at New Mexico Highlands University). The ERI, along with its sister institutes, provides ecological restoration research, development, and outreach throughout the West, as well as work experience, formal course work, and thesis opportunities for undergraduate and graduate students. Covington has been recognized as Outstanding Teaching Scholar by NAU for his dedication to involving undergraduates in his applied research projects, and bringing research results into the classroom and the field. Covington also presents invited testimony before congressional and state natural resource committees, gives presentations, and provides field trips for leaders of conservation agencies, such as the United States Forest Service, the Bureau of Land Management, the National Park Service, and Washington Offices of agencies, such as the Secretary of the Interior, and the Secretary of Agriculture.

== Work ==
Covington has made important contributions to the field of forest ecology in his theories of evidence based conservation, adaptive environmental assessment, ecological restoration, and use of presettlement conditions. He has introduced important theories in ponderosa pine forest management, including a return to conditions more characteristic of the evolutionary environment in order to forestall large crownfires, protect wildlife and endangered species, and increase forest health. His early work at Yale University on organic matter in forest soils and carbon levels led to a theory known as "Covington's curve," which suggested that logged soils lost 50% of their organic matter, and hence their ecologically important loads of carbon, within 20 years. Though the general applicability of the theory has been questioned, it continues to have influence in the field. For the last three decades Covington has worked tirelessly to reclaim the glory of declining ponderosa pine forests. His goal is to return forest structure and the density of trees to conditions approximately those of natural forests before they were disturbed by the impacts of Euro-American settlers. Research on these "presettlement conditions" led to a series of 1994 papers that present the case that many presettlement ponderosa stands were swept regularly by cooler, low-intensity fires, making them far less dense than today's forests. In Covington's presettlement model of restoration includes establishing reference conditions, removing younger trees and accumulated ground litter, and application of controlled low-intensity fires in an attempt to reduce competition and produce forests with larger, healthier trees less susceptible to disease and catastrophic fires.

== Selected publications ==
W.W. Covington has contributed to over 92 articles and books (Google Scholar 12,166 citations, h-index 56, i10-index 111). Selected publications include:

=== Books ===
- Covington, W.W. (2003). The Evolutionary and Historical Context for Restoration. In: Friederici, P. Ecological Restoration of Southwestern Ponderosa Pine Forests. Arizona: Arizona Board of Regents. 26-47.
- Covington, W.W. and Moore, M.M. (1994). Postsettlement Changes in Natural Fire Regimes and Forest Structure: Ecological Restoration of Old-Growth Ponderosa Pine Forests. In: Adams, D.L. and R.N. Sampson. Assessing Forest Ecosystem Health in the Inland West. Arizona: Haworth Press. 153-175.

=== Articles ===
- Noss, R.F., P. Beier, W.W. Covington, R.E. Grumbine, D.B. Lindenmayer, J.W. Prather, F. Schmiegelow, T.D. Sisk, and D.J. Vosick. 2006. Recommendations for Integrating Restoration Ecology and Conservation Biology in Ponderosa Pine Forests of the Southwestern United States. Restoration Ecology 14:4-10.
- Fulé, P.Z., J.E. Crouse, A.E. Cocke, M.M. Moore, and W.W. Covington. 2004. Changes in canopy fuels and potential fire behavior 1880-2040: Grand Canyon, Arizona. Ecological Modelling 175:231-248. Covington, W.W. 2003. Restoring ecosystem health in frequent-fire forests of the American West. Ecological Restoration 21:1: 7-11
- Covington, W.W., P.Z. Fulé, S.C. Hart, and R.P. Weaver. 2001. Modeling ecological restoration effects on ponderosa pine forest structure . Restoration Ecology 9(4):421-431.
- Covington, W.W. 2000. Helping western forests heal: The prognosis is poor for US forest ecosystems. Nature 408(6809):135-136.
