= Juxtlahuaca =

Coordinates: 17°26′21.36″N 99°9′34.03″W

Painting 1 from Juxtlahuaca.

Juxtlahuaca (Spanish pronunciation: [xuʃtlaˈwaka]), or Xiuxtlahuaca (Nahuatl pronunciation: [ʃjuʃtɬaˈwaka]), is a cave and archaeological site in the Mexican state of Guerrero containing murals linked to the Olmec motifs and iconography. Along with the nearby Oxtotitlán cave, Juxtlahuaca walls contain the earliest sophisticated painted art known in Mesoamerica, and only known example of non-Maya deep cave art in Mesoamerica.

== The cave ==
Juxtlahuaca and other Olmec-related sites in the Formative Period.

The Juxtlahuaca site is located some 45 km southeast of the state capital Chilpancingo in what is now a National Park. The entire cave system is slightly over 5 km. The caves, also called Grutas de Juxtlahuaca ("Grottos of Juxtlahuaca"), are a favorite destination of spelunkers. The caves are open to the public, but a local guide is required.

The site's paintings have been estimated to be over a kilometre down a long cavern: descent times are roughly two hours and some passages are partially filled with water.

== The paintings ==
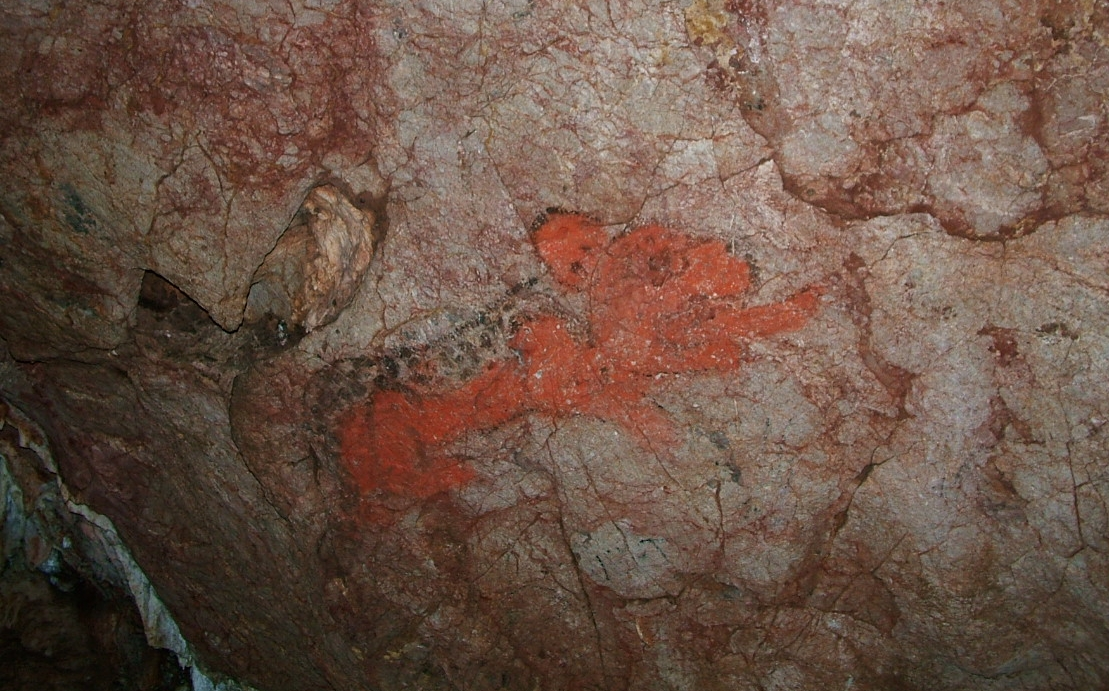
The red jaguar.

The most well-known of the cave art is Painting 1, which features a large bearded man with a black cloak, a striped tunic, and an elaborate headpiece. The arms and legs are covered with jaguar fur, and a small jaguar tail is even visible dangling down. The man is brandishing a trident at a much smaller figure crouched to his side and is carrying a long snake or snakelike object. This 2 meter (6 foot) tall painting is one of the rare Olmec-style portrayals of human-on-human dominance, which some researchers interpret as a scene of human sacrifice.

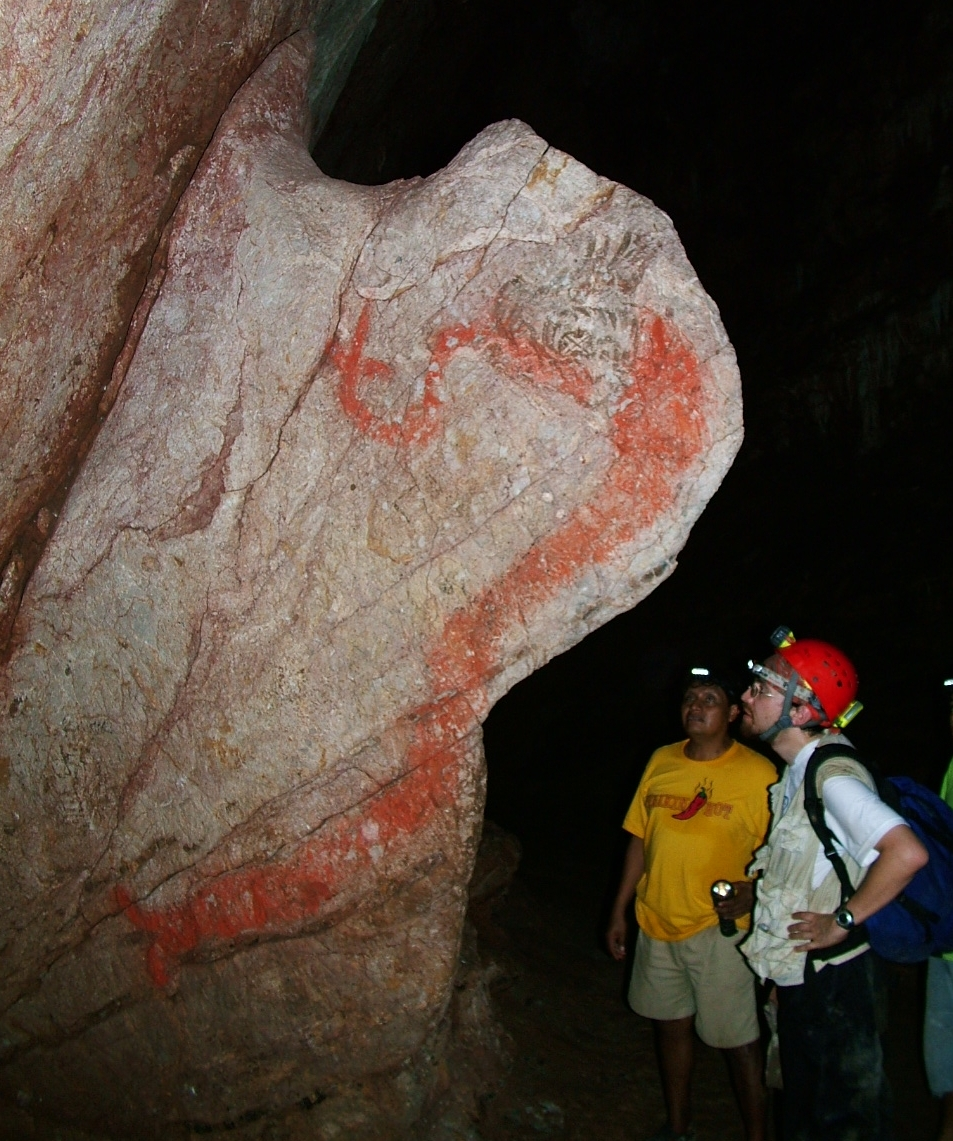
The feathered serpent.

Also of note in Juxtlahuaca is a painting of a red Feathered Serpent with green plumes, near a red jaguar whose large ears and eyes give it a youthful cast. A design that has provisionally been interpreted as a temple was found on a stalagmite.

The cave paintings have been known since at least the 1920s, but were first professionally documented in the early 1960s by Gillett Griffin of Princeton University and Carlo T. E. Gay, an Italian businessman. Archaeologist Michael D. Coe has estimated that the paintings "might probably be Early Preclassic (1200-900 BC, uncalibrated)" in date. Juxtalhuaca is, so far as is known, unassociated with any large town of that period. It is also not known how Olmec-influenced art came to be painted hundreds of kilometres (or miles) from the Olmec heartland. Caves are prominent on many Olmec-style monuments: several Olmec "altars" depict priests or rulers emerging from caves, and monuments and reliefs at the archaeological site of Chalcatzingo, to the north of Juxtlahuaca, also feature cave motifs.

== Other artifacts ==
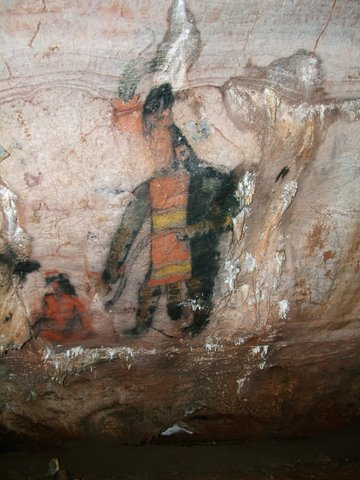
A photo of the ruler and smaller figure.

A dozen skeletons have been found in the so-called Hall of the Dead, located midway between the entrance and the paintings. From their positions, some extended and some in a fetal position, and their condition, covered with a stalactite crust, the skeletons are assumed to be ancient interments. Some have been partially buried as a result of a cave-in.

Just before the paintings, a 250-foot (80 m) artificial canal was cut into the red clay floor of the cave. The purpose of this canal is not known.

== See also ==
- Maya cave sites
- Olmec influences on Mesoamerican cultures
- Teopantecuanitlan
