= Covington Municipal Airport =

Covington Municipal Airport may refer to:

- Covington Municipal Airport (Georgia) in Covington, Georgia, United States (FAA: 9A1)
- Covington Municipal Airport (Tennessee) in Covington, Tennessee, United States (FAA: M04)
