= Covington Township =

Covington Township may refer to the following places in the United States:

- Covington Township, Washington County, Illinois
- Covington Township, Michigan
- Covington Township, Clearfield County, Pennsylvania
- Covington Township, Lackawanna County, Pennsylvania
- Covington Township, Tioga County, Pennsylvania
