= Maya cave sites =

Archeological sites

Mayan cave sites are associated with the Mayan civilization of pre-Columbian Mesoamerica. Beliefs and observances connected with these cave sites persist among some contemporary Mayan communities. Many of the Mayan caves served religious purposes. For this reason, the artifacts found there, alongside the epigraphic, iconographic, and ethnographic studies, help build the modern-day understanding of the Mayan religion and society.

== Study ==
In works compiled for the fight against idolatry, 16th-century Spanish sources mentioned 17 Maya caves and cenotes - nine of which have been found. In his book Relación de las cosas de Yucatán, friar Diego de Landa described the Sacred Cenote. Underground Maya archaeology began in the 1980s and 1990s.

The Museo Nacional de Antropología leads two projects to study Maya caves: Caves: Register of Prehispanic Cultures Evidence in Puuc Region, 1997, and The cult of the cenotes in the centre of the Yucatan.

In 2008, archaeologists found a Mayan underground complex of 11 temples, 100-metre-long stone roads, and a flooded labyrinth of caves on the Yucatan Peninsula.

The most famous caves are Balankanche, Loltun Cave, Actun Tunichil Muknal, and Jolja'.

== Associations with writing ==
"sign entry" or "impinged bone element" (versions of the early and late classical period)

It is not known which symbol represents a cave in Maya writing. According to James Brady, a cave is represented as a "sign entry" or "impinged bone element" in the Mayan texts. James Brady reads this sign as CH'EN or CH'EEN. As proof of his hypothesis, James Brady cites three arguments:

1) Use of the sign in the sentence denotes a certain place in which one can enter, sit down, or do a burial;

2) The visual sign shares common features with symbols of death, the underworld, and bats;

3) Phonetically, the sign ends in a consonant "N". In Mayan written language, this sign is part of the verb "OCH-WITZ" ("Go inside the mountain").

== Association with settlement ==
A desire to be near places considered sacred influenced Mesoamerican settlement patterns. Mountains and caves were important elements in Mesoamerican creation myths. Mesoamerican belief systems liken water to fertility, and mountains give flowing water and rainfall through caves. Accordingly, these natural features were considered sacred and sought out by Mesoamerican migrants looking for new homes. A cave could be considered an axis mundi if it was located in the center of a village. The Late Postclassic site at Mayapan incorporated several cenotes into ceremonial groups, and the Cenote Ch'en Mul is at the heart of the site. At Dos Pilas, house platforms were often in front of cave entries and tunnels went beneath the platform.

== Architectural landscapes and themes ==
Artificial landscapes often mimic sacred landscapes. Temple doorways were seen as cave entrances into mountains. Sometimes these doorways were carved to look like the mouths of monsters. The Aztec also did this. At Utatlán they designed an artificial cave that ends under the central plaza and is modeled on the mythical seven-chamber cave of emergence, Chicomoztoc. This is also seen at Teotihuacan, though the details differ somewhat. At Muklebal Tzul, an artificial well underneath a massive platform was made to appear like a water-bearing cave. In the Yucatan, many Late Postclassic temples had Spanish churches built on the top of them after the conquest, and caves and cenotes can still be found near these places today.

== Entrances to the underworld ==
Caves are often described as entries into the watery Mayan underworld. For Mesoamerican groups, including the Maya, life and death occur at liminal zones between this world and the underworld. Caves were associated with both life and death; when something emerged from the underworld, it was then alive, and when something descended into the underworld, it died. Caves were also seen as birthplaces where humans and their ancestors were born and lived. The Maya of the Yucatan also believed that the sun and moon were born in the underworld.

== Associations with sex and fertility ==
There appears to be a strong association (and perhaps conflation) between caves and sweat baths. Often perceived as female and likened to the womb and vagina, caves are a symbol of fertility. Sweat baths have also been associated with human fertility, and both have strong sexual connotations. For example, a painting at Naj Tunich portrays a couple engaged in intercourse. Contemporary Tzotzil Maya believe that a hypersexual being lives inside caves and sweat baths have been places of illicit sex amongst many Maya groups. Artifacts found at a sweat bath on the periphery of Piedras Negras included a circular mirror and five seashells, artifacts that have been associated with the watery underworld. Seashells have also been found in the artificial caves under the Pyramid of the Sun at Teotihuacan.

Speleothems in caves have also been regarded as sacred and have played a role in Maya religion. Caves are considered to be "living beings with personhood and souls," and according to a 41-year-old Q'eqchi' Maya, their speleothems "are also alive, they grow and sweat water; they themselves are water". People may take these rocks from the caves and put them on their altars. The Xibun Maya incorporated speleothems into the construction of the ball court at the Hershey site. Ball courts have been associated with the underworld, just as the caves had been.

== Associations with natural forces ==
Caves are linked with wind, rain and clouds. The Zinacantecos of the Chiapas highlands believes that lightning comes from caves. The Yukatek and Lacandon believe that caves and cenotes are where rain deities reside and the Yucatec of the 16th century sacrificed humans to appease these deities.

At Dos Pilas the Cueva de Murciélagos rests beneath the royal palace platform. After it rains heavily, water rushes out from this cave, signaling the beginning of the rainy season and the advance of the crop cycle. This artificial landscape showed that the king had control over water, rainmaking, and fertility, thereby legitimizing his authority.

Caves have been used in art to legitimize authority and elevate status. For example, depictions of individuals at the mouth of a cave endowed them with authority that is often associated with shamanism. Scribal imagery is often associated with a skeletal jaw (maws are often likened to the mouths of caves), which may indicate that caves are where this craft originated. Perhaps this imagery "served to mystify and exalt the scribe's role".

== Associations of art and ritual ==
Caves are often associated with transformation. At the Cenote X-Coton, a stone figure depicts a human making an offering, possibly wearing a jaguar's skin with the human's face coming out of its mouth. In addition to water and sacrifice rituals, the cenote may have been used for wayob transformations.

Human sacrifice to gods connected to caves was widespread. These sacrifices either occurred in the cave, or the body was put in the cave afterward. It is noted that children had commonly been sacrificed in the Yucata, child sacrifice was recorded in Highland Guatemala as well.

Mayan cave sites have also attracted thieves and invaders. Consequently, some of them have been walled shut to stop any damage to the sites. The immured caves of Dos Pilas and Naj Tunich have been sealed. Archaeologists have found caves that have been sealed such as the Cueva del Duende. It is possible that the desecration of caves could have been used as a symbol of conquest and political legitimacy. Another explanation could relate to termination rituals that have often been seen in architectural construction.

== Offerings ==
Agricultural products are common offerings in caves. Modern Maya believes that maize originated beneath the earth, an idea perhaps expressed by classic depictions of the Maize God emerging from the underworld. This belief gave caves life-giving power, as accounts from the Popul Vuh indicated that humans were made from maize dough. Domesticated plants found in lowland caves were probably used in rituals performed for deities related to agricultural fertility. Agricultural products are still used in agricultural rituals by the contemporary Maya.

Jade is a frequent cave offering. The most jade found at a single site was at the Cenote of Sacrifice at Chichen Itza. Metal was a common offering during the Postclassic, with the largest collections coming from the Cenote of Sacrifice and "bell" caves in western Honduras. The tale of the Earth Lord having much wealth in his cave may have come from this tradition.

== Burials ==
It appears that elite cave burials were rare but common people may have used caves as burial places, such as at the Caves Branch Rock Shelter in Belize. Two tomb structures have been discovered in caves to date, one at Naj Tunich and the other at Quen Santo, both in Guatemala. Lineage founders have also been buried in caves. Elites were able to build their own elaborate burial "caves" and by doing so reinforced their power and status. It seems elites tried to make their tombs look like natural caves. Stalactites found at Tomb 2 of Nim Li Punit provide an example of this.

== See also ==
Mesoamerican cave sites

- Juxtlahuaca - Olmec
- Loltun Cave - Mayan
- Ndaxagua - Zapotec and Mixtec
- Oxtotitlán - Olmec

Other

- List of caves in Mexico
