= William Jacob Covington =

William Jacob Convington
- Born: July 1, 1838; Spartanburg District South Carolina, U.S.
- Died: January 24, 1910 (aged 71); Memphis, Tennessee, U.S.
- Resting place: St. John's Episcopal Church, Memphis, Tennessee
- Occupation: First district court clerk of Camp County, Texas

Pvt. William Jacob Covington (July 1, 1838, Spartanburg District, S.C. – January 24, 1910, Memphis, Tennessee) was the first district Court Clerk of Camp County, Texas. A year following the American Civil War, Covington moved to Texas, and there in 1876, he was elected to serve as the first district court clerk of the newly formed Camp County.

== Personal background ==
In 1838 William Covington was born in a two-story chestnut log home built by his relatives in 1799. Covington fought in eight major Civil War battles. Among these were the battle of Harpers Ferry, Antietam, battle of Fredericksburg, battle of Chancellorsville, battle of Gettysburg and battle of Williamsport also known as Falling Waters.

After surviving the battle of Gettysburg, Pennsylvania, he was captured at Falling Waters, Maryland on July 14, 1863, during Lee's retreat from Baltimore, Maryland. From Baltimore he was sent to Point Lookout POW camp.

Covington was among the 975 repatriated soldiers who traveled the New York exchange steamer to City Point, Virginia, after being formally exchanged on March 19, 1863. A few months later he rejoined his regiment, the 18th North Carolina Infantry (Lane's Brigade, Pender's Division, III Corps, Confederate Army of Northern Virginia). During the Battle of Jerusalem Plank Road, he was wounded and re-captured. His leg was amputated at City Point and again at Campbell Gen. Hospital in the District of Columbia. He was sent to two different hospitals in Washington, DC (where the Mall is now located by the Smithsonian Institution).

Signing his parole on July 18, 1865, he was released and with one leg and a pair of crutches he made his way "walking" back to Spartenburg Dist. South Carolina. Before arriving at home he met his older brother who had been shot through the neck and captured late in the war. The two arrived home together, both had been long given up for dead.

After the harvesting of crops in the early fall of 1870, the Covington, Weaver and McIntyre families traveled by covered wagons from Rutherford County, North Carolina to Upshur County, Texas, arriving in late 1870. In 1874, Camp County, Texas was formed out of Upshur County, Texas and Covington was elected as the first district/county court clerk of the newly created Camp County. The positions for district and county clerks were a consolidated position in Texas until the end of the reconstruction period in 1876.

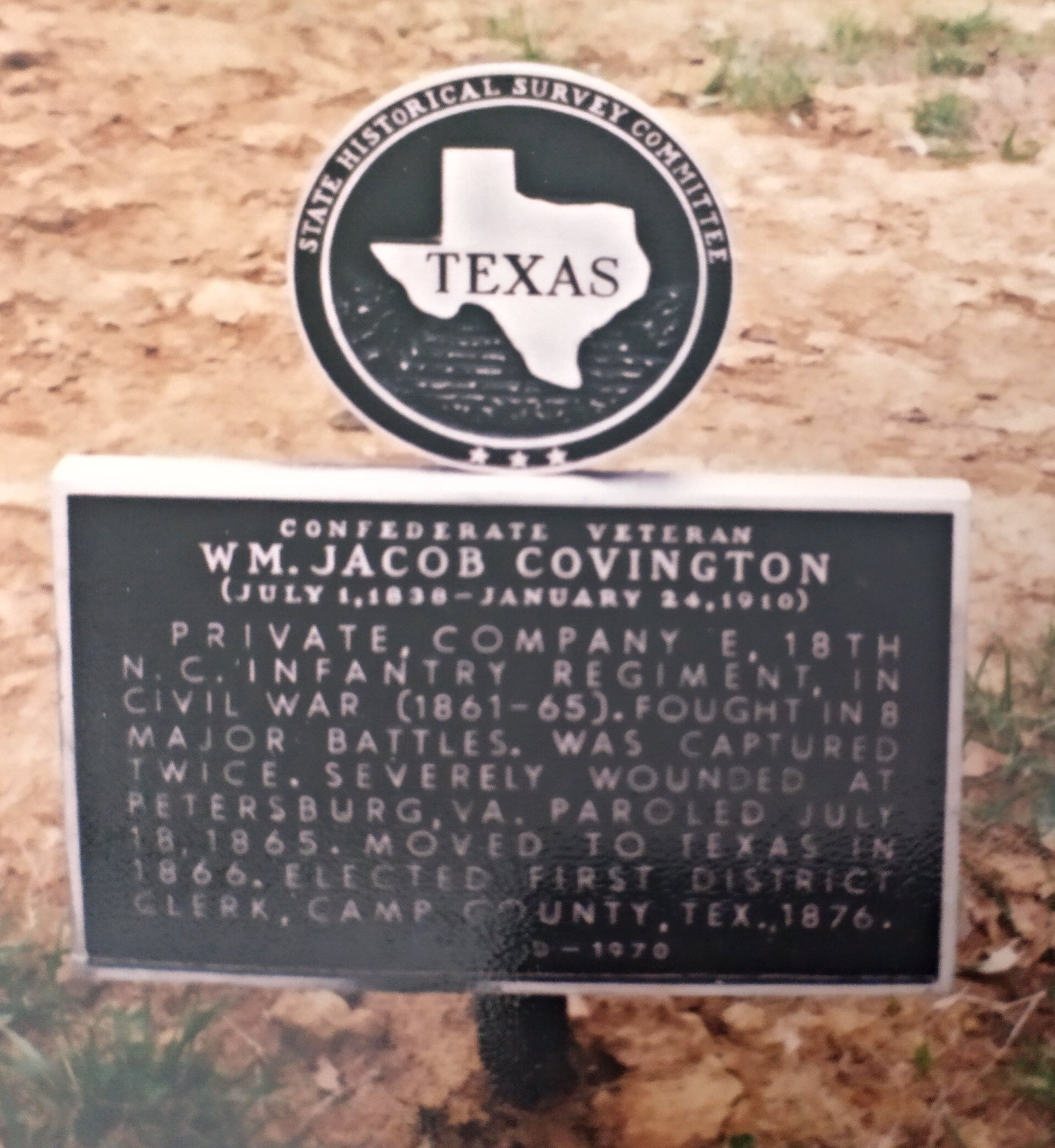
Headstone of Wm. Jacob Covington

Covington was buried at the St. John's Episcopal Church Cemetery adjacent to the Memphis Museum, Central Ave., Memphis, TN. His place of burial was designated with an official historical plaque from the State of Texas Historical Survey Committee on October 20, 1970.
