= History of Oaxaca =

In the Central Valley region of the Southeastern Mexican state of Oaxaca archeologists discovered evidence of historic settlements. Aztecs from Tenochtitlan on the volcanic plateau to the North around what today is Mexico City first arrived in this region around 1250 AD establishing military rule in the 15th century until the arrival of the Spanish. After the fall of Tenochtitlan, the Spanish took over Oaxaca which led to the eventual decrease of the Native population and the increase in African slaves. The region was then settled by mostly Spanish immigrants from Europe and the African slaves they brought with them. Oaxaca was considered a department after the Mexican War of Independence, but after the fall of emperor Agustín de Iturbide, it became a state in 1824 with José Murguia as its first governor. During the 19th century, Oaxaca was split between liberal and conservative factions. The political and military struggles between the factions resulted in wars and intrigues. A series of major disasters occurred in the state from the 1920s to the 1940s. In the 1940s and 1950s, new infrastructure projects were begun. From the 1980s to the present, there has been much development of the tourism industry in the state.

== Pre-historic and pre-Hispanic period ==
Most of what is known about pre-historic Oaxaca comes from archeological work in the Central Valleys region. Evidence of human habitation dating back to about 11,000 years BC has been found in the Guilá Naquitz cave near the town of Mitla. More finds of nomadic peoples date back to about 5000 BC, with some evidence of the beginning of agriculture. By 2000 BC, agriculture had been established in the Central Valleys region of the state, with sedentary villages. The diet developed around this time would remain until the Spanish Conquest, consisting primarily of harvested corn, beans, chocolate, tomatoes, chili peppers, squash and gourds. Meat was generally hunted and included tepezcuintle, turkey, deer, jabali, armadillo and iguana.

The oldest known major settlements, such as Yanhuitlán and Laguna Zope (immediately southwest of Juchitán de Zaragoza) are located in this area as well. The latter settlement is known for its small figures called “pretty women” or “baby face.” Between 1200 and 900 BC, pottery was being produced in the area as well. This pottery has been linked with similar work done in La Victoria, Guatemala. Other important settlements from the same time period include Tierras Largas, San José Mogote and Guadalupe, whose ceramics show Olmec influence. The major native linguistic group, Oto-Manguean, can be traced back to at least 4400 BC. By 1500 BC, there were nine branches of this language.

There are historical records from the area dating back as far as the 12th century, but except for the Zapotecs and Mixtecs, there is very few records of the native peoples of the state from the pre-Hispanic era into much of the colonial era. By 500 BC, these valleys were mostly inhabited by the Zapotecs, with the Mixtecs on the western side. These two groups would be in near constant conflict until the end of the pre-Hispanic period. Archeological evidence indicates that between 750 and 1521, there may have been population peaks of as high as 2.5 million.

The Zapotecs were the earliest to gain dominance over the Central Valleys region. The first major dominion was centered in Monte Albán, which flourished from 500 BC until 750 AD. At its height, Monte Albán was home to some 25,000 people and was the capital city of the Zapotec nation. It remained a secondary center of power for the Zapotecs until the Mixtecs overran it in 1325. The site contains a number of notable features including the Danzantes, a set of stone reliefs and the finding of fine quality ceramics.

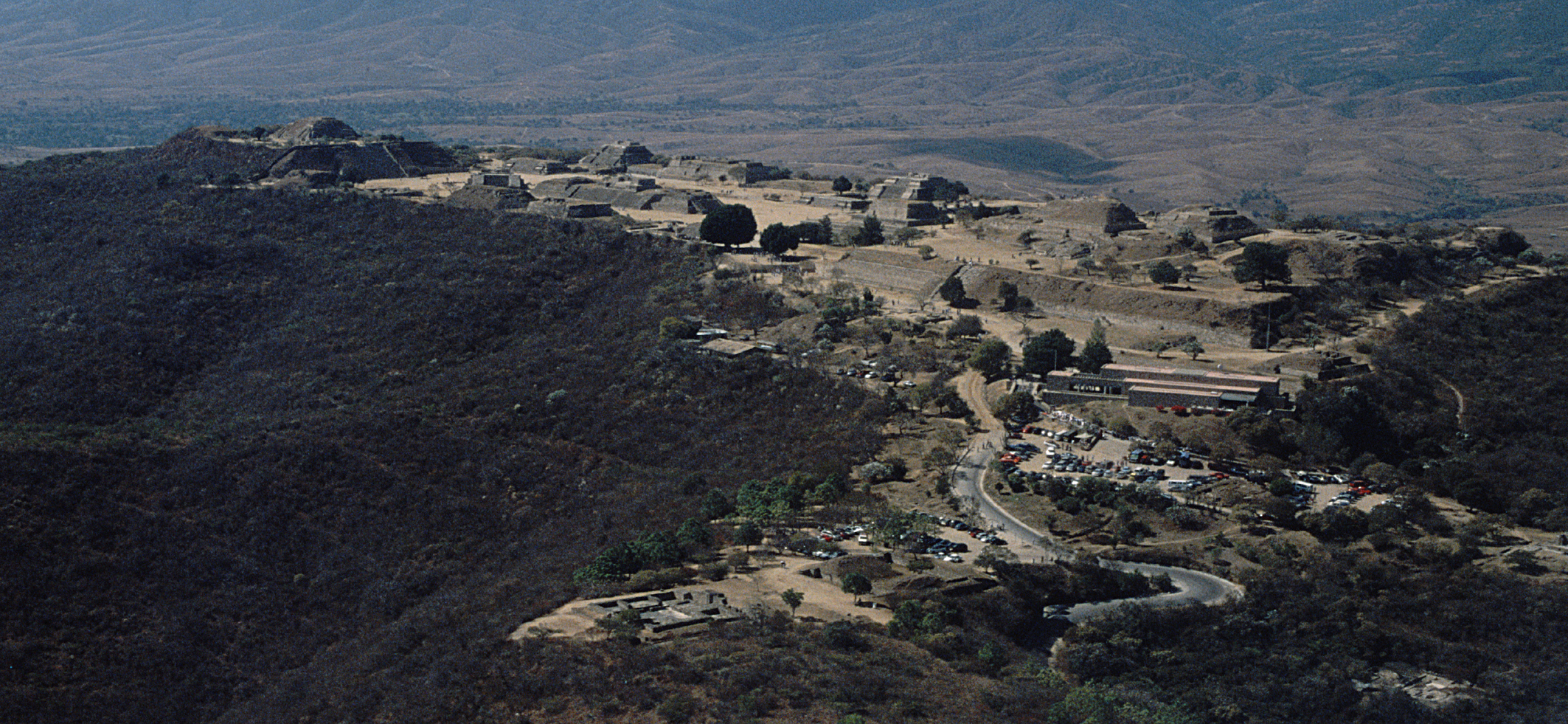
Looking southwest over the site of Monte Albán

Starting from 750 AD large urban centers such as Monte Albán fell across the Oaxaca area and smaller dominions grew and evolved until the Spanish Conquest in 1521. Between 700 and 1300, the Mixtec were scattered among various dominions, including those of Achiutla, Tequixtepec-Chazumba, Apoala and Coixtlahuaca. The Zapotecs occupied the Central Valleys and some neighboring areas. However, no major city state like Monte Albán arose again, with villages and city-states remaining small, between 1,000 and 3,000 people with a palace, temple, market and residences. In a number of cases, there were Mesoamerican ball courts as well. These and larger centers also functioned as military fortresses in time of invasion. Important Zapotec and Mixtec sites include Yagul, Zaachila, Inguiteria, Yanhuitlan, Tamazulapan, Tejupan, and Teposcolula. During nearly all of this time, these various entities were at war with one another, and faced the threat of Aztec expansion.

While the Zapotec remained dominant in many parts of the Central Valleys through the late postclassic period and expanded into the Isthmus of Tehuantepec, the Mixtec expanded into Zapotec territory through both marriage alliances and military means, taking Monte Albán. In areas they conquered, they became prolific builders, leaving behind numerous and still unexplored sites. However, the conquest of the Central Valleys was never completed, with pressure coming from the Aztecs of Tenochtitlan in the 14th and 15th centuries. The Zapotecs and Mixtecs both allied themselves and fought among themselves as they tried to maintain their lands and valuable trade routes between the high central plains of Mexico and Central America.

The first Nahuas arrived to the Oaxaca area in 1250, but Aztec expansion into the region began in the 15th century. In 1457, Moctezuma I invaded the Tlaxiaco and Coixtlahuaca areas, gaining control, demanding tribute and establishing military outposts. These were Mixtec lands at first, pushing these people even further into Zapotec territory. Under Axayacatl and Tizoc, the Aztec began to take control of trade routes in the area and part of the Pacific Coast. By this time, the Zapotec were led by Cosijoeza with the government in Zaachila in the latter 15th century. Under Ahuitzotl, the Aztecs temporarily pushed the Zapotecs into Tehuantepec and established a permanent military base at Huaxyacac (Oaxaca City). The Aztecs were stopped only by the Spanish Conquest. These conquests would change most of the place names in parts of Oaxaca to those from the Nahuatl language. In 1486 the Aztecs established a fort on the hill of Huaxyácac (now called El Fortín), overlooking the present city of Oaxaca. This was the major Aztec military base charged with the enforcement of tribute collection and control of trade routes. However, Aztec rule in Oaxaca would last only a little more than thirty years.

== Colonial period ==
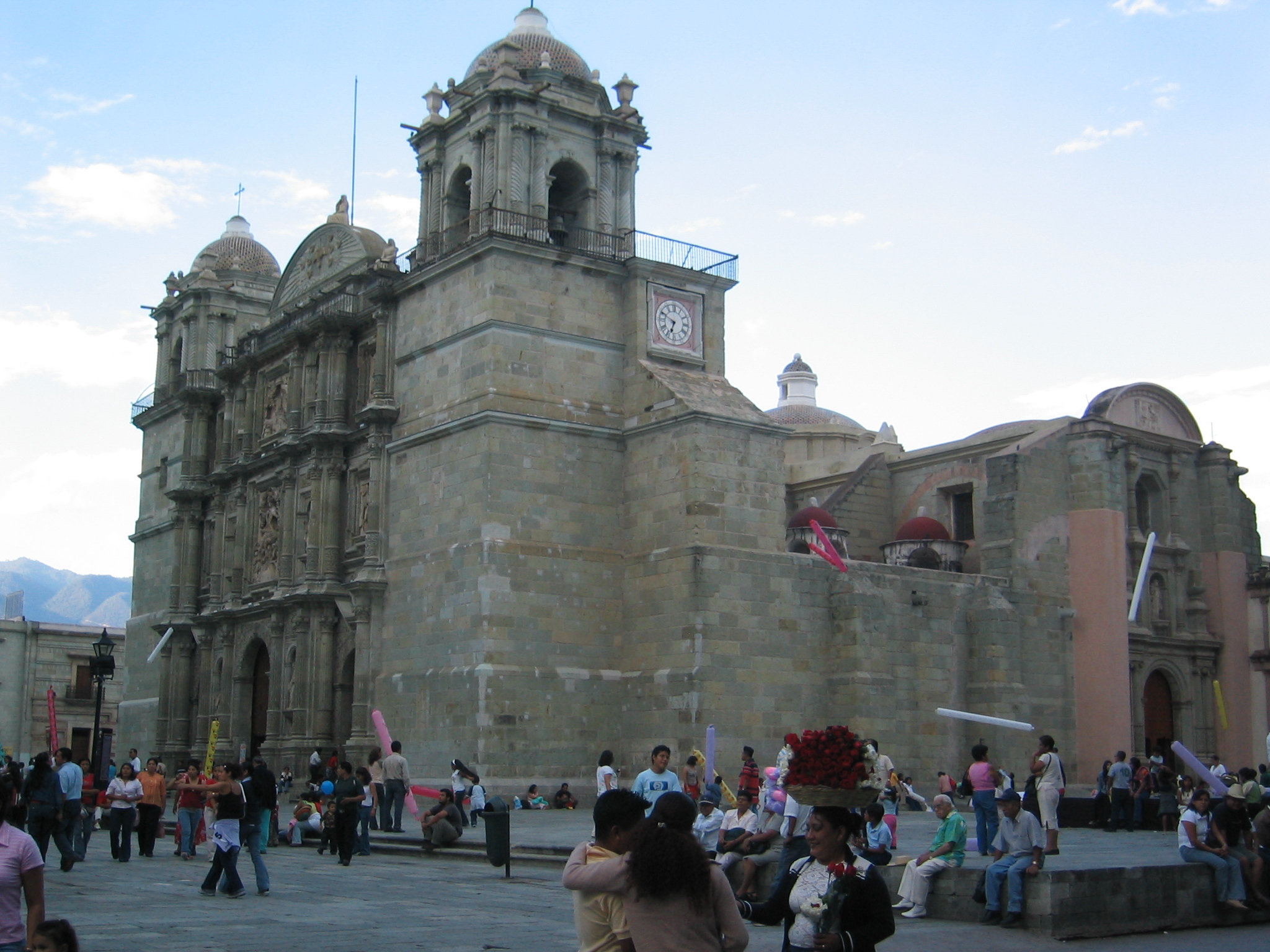
Cathedral of Oaxaca

Very soon after the fall of Tenochtitlan (Mexico City), Spaniards arrived in Oaxaca. Moctezuma II had informed Hernán Cortés that the area had gold. In addition, when Zapotec leaders heard about the Spanish conquest of the Aztec Empire, they sent an offer of an alliance. Several captains and representatives were sent to the area to explore the area, looking for gold, and routes to the Pacific to establish trade routes to Asian spice markets. The most prominent of Cortés’ captains to arrive here were Gonzalo de Sandoval, Francisco de Orozco and Pedro de Alvarado. They overcame the main Aztec military stronghold only four months after the fall of Tenochtitlan. Their reports about the area prompted Cortés to seek the title of the Marquis of the Valley of Oaxaca from the Spanish Crown.

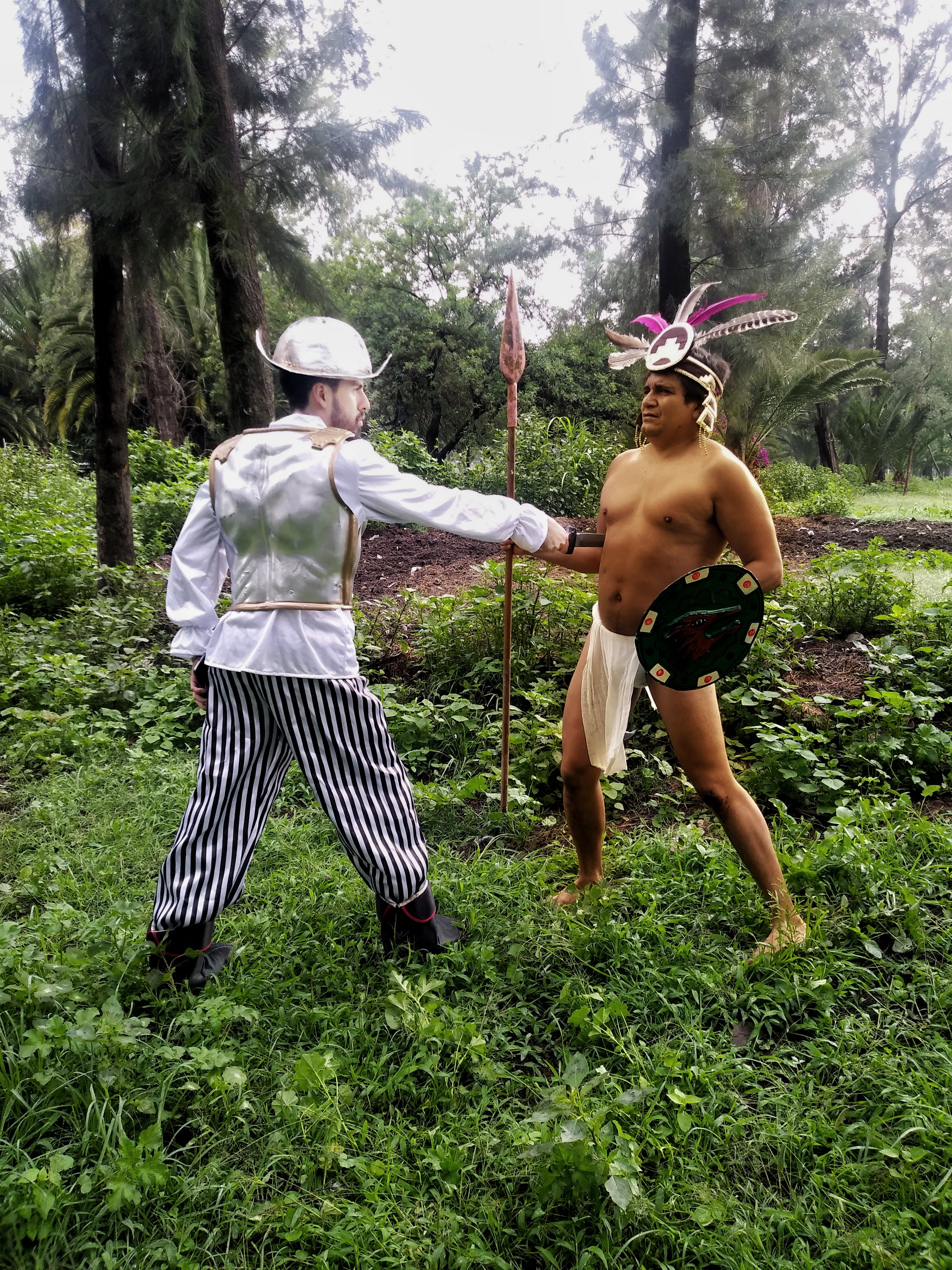
Theatrical recreation of a battle between an indigenous warrior and a conquistador

The valley Zapotecs, the Mixtecs of the Upper Mixteca, the Mazatecas and the Cuicatecas, for the most part, chose not to fight the newcomers, instead negotiating to keep most of the old hierarchy but with ultimate authority to the Spanish. Resistance to the new order was sporadic and confined to the Pacific coastal plain, the Zapotec Sierra, the Mixe region and the Isthmus of Tehuantepec. The Mixes put up the most resistance to intrusions on their lands. They not only resisted during the first decade or so of Spanish occupation, like other groups, but through the rest of the 16th century. The last major Mixe rebellion came in 1570, when they burned and looted Zapotec communities and threatened to annihilate the Spanish presidio of Villa Alta. However, this rebellion was put down by the Spanish, in alliance with about 2,000 Mixtecs and Aztecs. From this point, the Mixe people retreated to isolated parts of the Sierra Norte mountain range where they still live today.

The first priest in the territory was Juan Díaz, who accompanied Francisco de Orozco y Tovar and build the first church in what is now the city of Oaxaca. He was followed by Bartolome de Olmade and others who began the superficial conversion of a number of indigenous, including the baptism of Zapotec leader Cosijoeza. In 1528, the Dominicans settled in the city of Oaxaca, forming the Bishopric of Oaxaca in 1535, and began to spread out from there, eventually reaching Tehuantepec and the coast. Other orders followed such as the Jesuits in 1596, the Mercedarians in 1601, and others in the 17th and 18th centuries.

Spanish conquest and the subsequent colonization and systematic exploitation of the region had a devastating effect on the indigenous population. Diseases introduced from Europe and forced labor led to the drastic reduction of the indigenous population and in some areas to its annihilation. It has been estimated that the indigenous population of the region declined from 1.5 million in 1520 to 150,000 in 1650. The reduction in the labor force they could dispose of prompted the Spanish to import African slaves, particularly in the Coastal Areas. The systematic exploitation of indigenous and African populations continued throughout the colonial period. Initially, the Spanish did not change native power structures and allowed nobles to keep their privileges as long as they were loyal to the Spanish crown. However, all indigenous were eventually lumped into the category as the Spanish halted warfare among the city-states and creating the official category of “indio” (Indian). Settlers arriving from Spain brought with them domestic animals that had never been seen in Oaxaca: horses, cows, goats, sheep, chickens, mules and oxen. New crops such as sugar cane, vanilla and tobacco were introduced. However, landholding still remained mostly in indigenous hands, in spite of the fact that only nine percent of Oaxaca's terrain is arable. The efforts by Spanish officials and merchants who tried to take indigenous privileges away met resistance. While some of it was violent, the indigenous also resorted to the administrative-judicial system or yield. Violence was reserved for the worst of situations. A local product to reach economic importance in the colonial period was the cochineal insect, used for the making of textile dyes. This product was exported to Europe, especially in the 17th and 18th centuries. The use of this insect faded in the 19th century with the discovery of cheaper dyes.

For much of the colonial period, the state (then an intendencia or province) was relatively isolated with few roads and other forms of communication. Most politics and social issues were strictly on the local level. Despite Spanish domination, the indigenous peoples of Oaxaca maintained much of their culture and identity, more so than most other places in Mexico. Part of this is due to the geography of the land, making many communities isolated.

== Independence ==
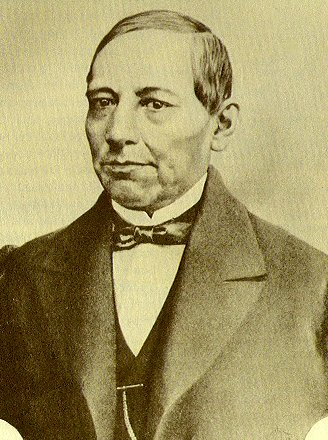
Benito Juarez

By 1810, the city of Oaxaca had 18,000 inhabitants, most of whom were mestizos (of both Indigenous and European descent). During the Mexican War of Independence the government of this area remained loyal to the Spanish Crown. When representatives of Miguel Hidalgo y Costilla came to meet with them, they were hanged and their heads were displayed publicly. Some early rebel groups emerged in the state, such as those led by Felipe Tinoco and Catarino Palacios, but these leaders were also eventually executed. After 1812, insurgents began to have some success in the state, especially in the areas around Huajuapan de León, where Valerio Trujano defended the city against royalist forces until José María Morelos y Pavón was able to come in with support to keep the area in rebel hands. After that point, insurgents had greater success in various parts of the state, but the capital remained in royalist hands until the end of the war.

The state was a department after the war ended in 1821, but after the fall of emperor Agustín de Iturbide, it became a state in 1824 with Jose Maria Murguia named as its first governor.

During the 19th century, Oaxaca and the rest of Mexico was split between liberal (federalist) and conservative (centralist) factions. The political and military struggles between the factions resulted in wars and intrigues. Vicente Guerrero, a liberal, was executed by firing squad in Cuilapam in 1831. Liberal Manuel Gomez Pedraza became governor in 1832 but was opposed by General Estaban Moctezuma. He and commandant Luis Quintanar persecuted liberals in the state, including Benito Juárez. The constant warfare had a negative effect on the state's economy and those in the Tehuantepec area supported a separatist movement which was partially successful in the 1850s.

Two Oaxacans, Benito Juarez and Porfirio Díaz became prominent players in the Reform War. It is difficult to overstate Juárez's meaning to the state. He was born on March 21, 1806, in the village of San Pablo Guelatao and was full blooded Zapotec. He began his career studying to be a priest then a lawyer. In 1847, Juarez became governor of Oaxaca, but still faced stern opposition from conservatives such as Lope San Germán. With the success of the Plan de Ayutla, Juarez became governor again, and worked to remove privileges and properties from the Church and landed classes. The Constitution of 1857, was ratified in Oaxaca city, and Juarez left the governor's position to become first the President of the Supreme Court and, later, President of Mexico. He was president during one of Mexico's most turbulent times, fighting invading French forces and conservatives. As a liberal, he imposed many of the reforms which remain today including those in education and separation of church and state. He is also considered to be a legend and a symbol for the indigenous population of the state.

Porfirio Díaz was Juárez's ally through the French Intervention. French imperial forces took Oaxaca city, which was defended by Porfirio Díaz, landing the latter in prison. The capital was later recaptured by the liberals under Carlos Oronoz. However, soon after Juarez took back the presidency, Porfirio Díaz declared rebellion against him from Oaxaca in 1872 under the Plan de Tuxtepec. Juárez died in office. Díaz became president until the Mexican Revolution.

== Late 19th century to present ==
During Díaz's rule, called the Porfiriato, a number of modernization efforts were undertaken in the state such as public lighting, first with gas then with electricity, railroad lines, new agriculture techniques and the revitalization of commerce. However, most of the benefits of these advances went to national and international corporations and workers and indigenous farmers organized against the regime.

After the Mexican Revolution broke out, Díaz was soon ousted and the rest of the war was among the various factions that had power in different parts of the country. Various leaders such as Francisco I. Madero, Victoriano Huerta and Venustiano Carranza came to the state during this time. However the most important force in the area was the Liberation Army of the South under Emiliano Zapata. This army fought against the previous leaders, especially Venustiano Carranza, and held various portions of the state until 1920. At the end of the Revolution, a new state constitution was written and accepted in 1922.

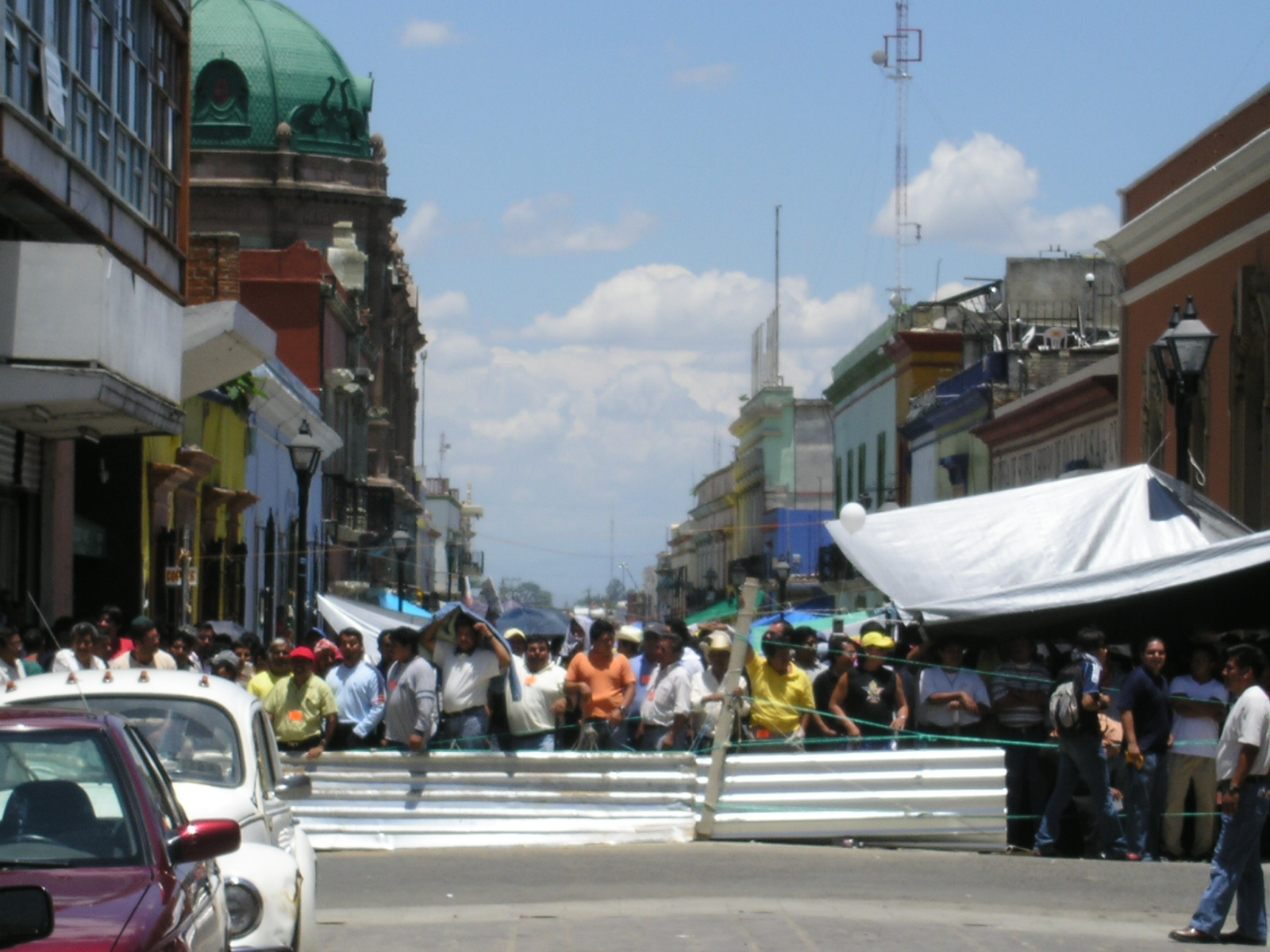
Protesters in Oaxaca, 2006

A series of major disasters occurred in the state from the 1920s to the 1940s. In 1928, a series of earthquakes destroyed many of the buildings in the capital. A much larger earthquake in 1931 was the largest in the state's history, devastating a number of cities along the coast. The 1930s brought the Great Depression, which along with the disasters, prompted wide-scale migration to Mexico City. In 1944, torrential rains caused massive flooding in the Tuxtepec region, causing hundreds of deaths. Oaxaca suffered more large earthquakes in 1980, 1999, 2017, and 2020, as well as one in 2018, which caused a deadly helicopter crash.

In the 1940s and 1950s, new infrastructure projects were begun. These included the Izúcar-Tehuantepec section of the Panamerican Highway and the construction of the Miguel Alemán Dam. From the 1980s to the present, there has been much development of the tourism industry in the state. This tourism, and the population growth of the capital, prompted the construction of the Oaxaca-Mexico City highway in 1994. Development of tourism has been strongest in the Central Valleys area surrounding the capital, with secondary developments in Huatulco and other locations along the coast. This development was threatened by the violence associated with the 2006 uprising, which severely curtailed the number of incoming tourists for several years. On February 12, 2008, a 6.4 magnitude earthquake was recorded in Oaxaca.

From the Mexican Revolution until the 2000s, the ruling Institutional Revolutionary Party (PRI) party held control of almost all of Oaxacan politics from the local to the state level. Challenges to the rule were sporadic and included the student movements of the 1970s, which brought down the state government. Teachers’ strikes had been frequent since then, culminating in the 2006 popular mobilization by a broad spectrum of civil society actors, which included union activists, indigenous organizations, as well as organized women and youths who constituted the Popular Assembly of the Peoples of Oaxaca (APPO). Between May and November 2006 the APPO-activists mobilized the local population in local councils, soup kitchens and barricades organizing demonstrations with the participation of more than a hundred thousand protesting against the marginalization of the poor and calling for the ousting of PRI-governor Ulises Ruiz Ortiz. With the aid of the Calderón government in Mexico City who sent in thousands of Federal police, the blockade of the city was eventually ended by force and resulted in dozens of deaths and an even higher number of "disappeared" activists. The PRI lost its hold on the state government in 2010.
