= Tulum =

Maya site in Quintana Roo, Mexico

- Tulu'um
- Zamá
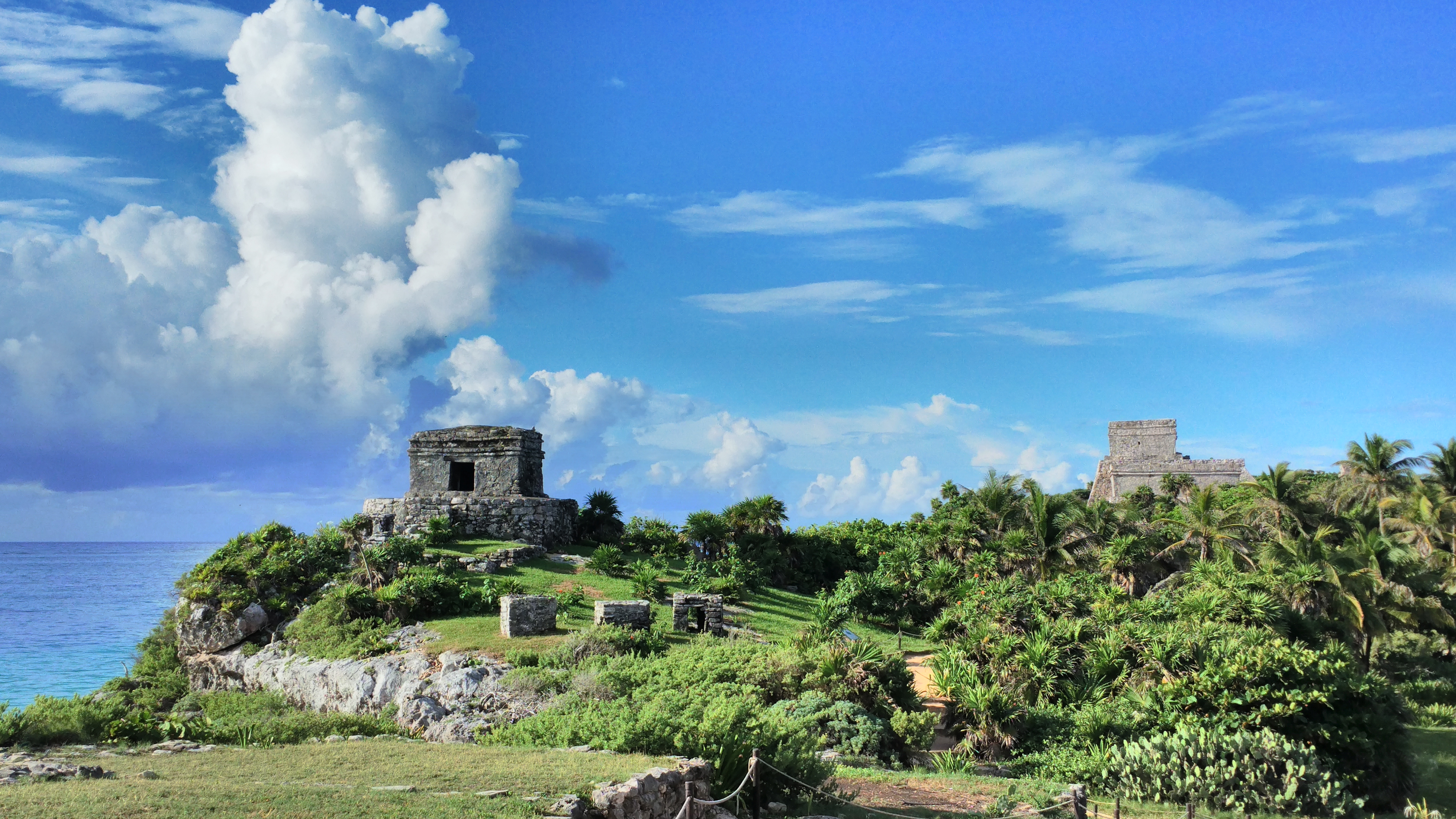
- Temple of the God of Wind (left) and Castillo (right)

- Location within Mesoamerica Location within Quintana Roo
- 20°12′53″N 87°25′44″W
- Periods: Late Preclassic to Late Postclassic
- Cultures: Maya civilization
- Location: Tulum, Quintana Roo, Mexico
- Region: Yucatán Peninsula

History
- Built: 1200 and 1450
- Abandoned: 1847

Site notes
- Condition: In ruins

Tulum (Spanish pronunciation: [tuˈlun]; Yucatec Maya: Tulu'um) is the site of a pre-Columbian Mayan walled city which served as a major port for Coba, in the Mexican state of Quintana Roo. The ruins are situated on 12-meter-tall (39 ft) cliffs along the east coast of the Yucatán Peninsula on the Caribbean Sea. Tulum was one of the last cities built and inhabited by the Maya and achieved its greatest prominence between the 13th and 15th centuries. Maya continued to occupy Tulum for about 70 years after the Spanish began exploring Mexico, but the city was abandoned by the end of the 16th century. Tulum is one of the best-preserved coastal Maya sites, and today it is a popular site for tourists.

== History and description ==
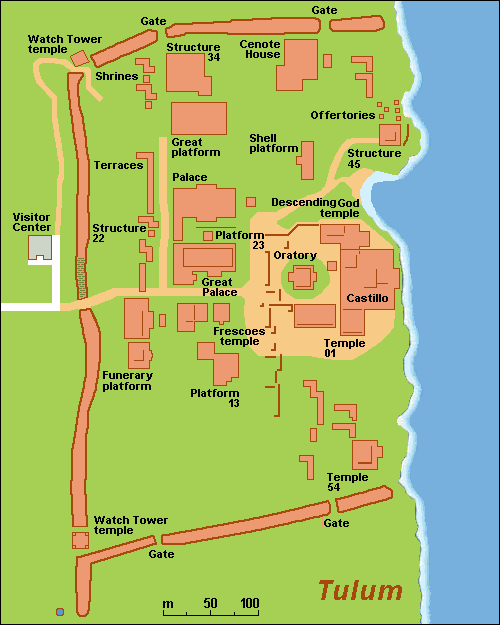
Map of central Tulum

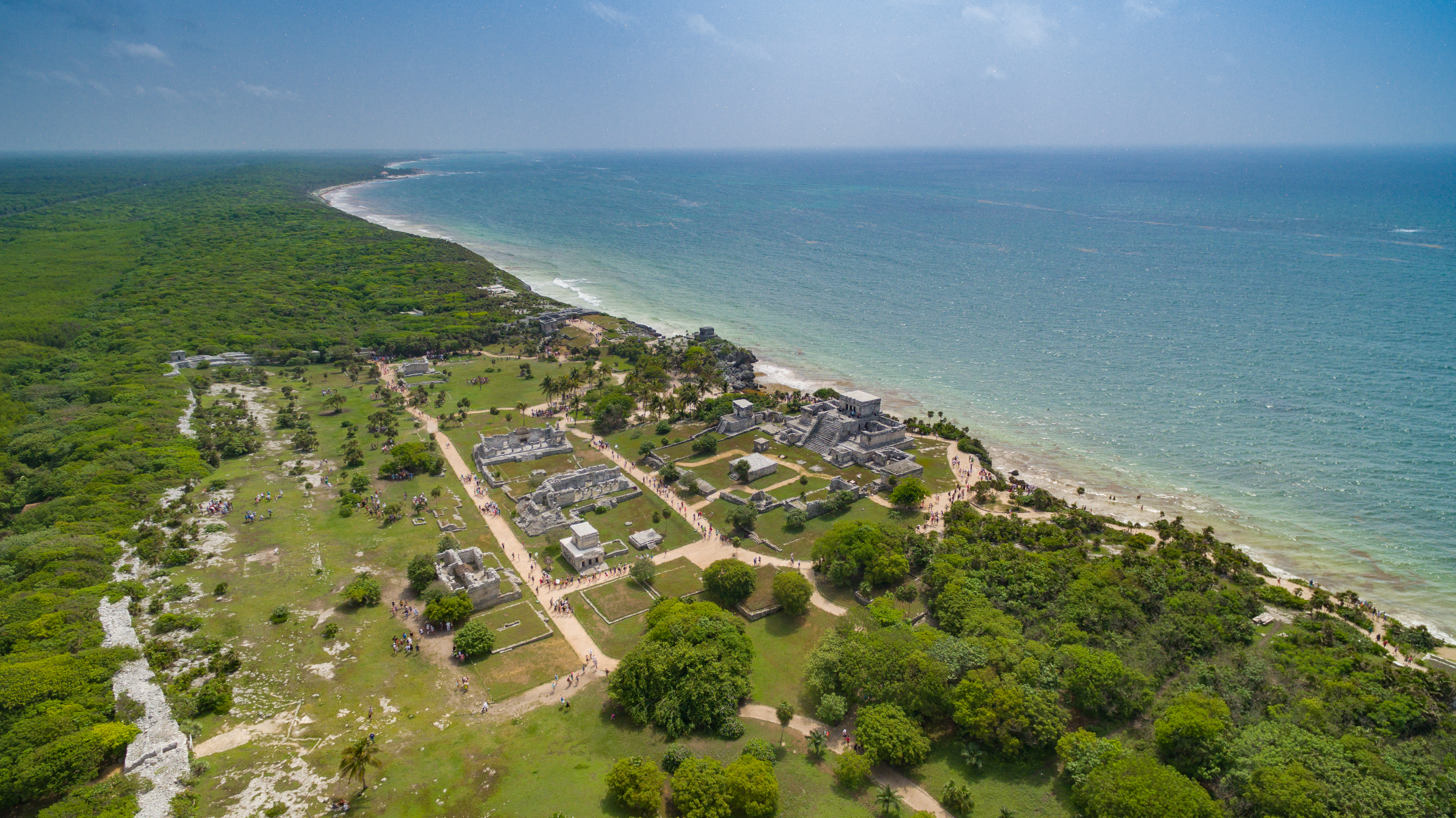
Tulum Ruins

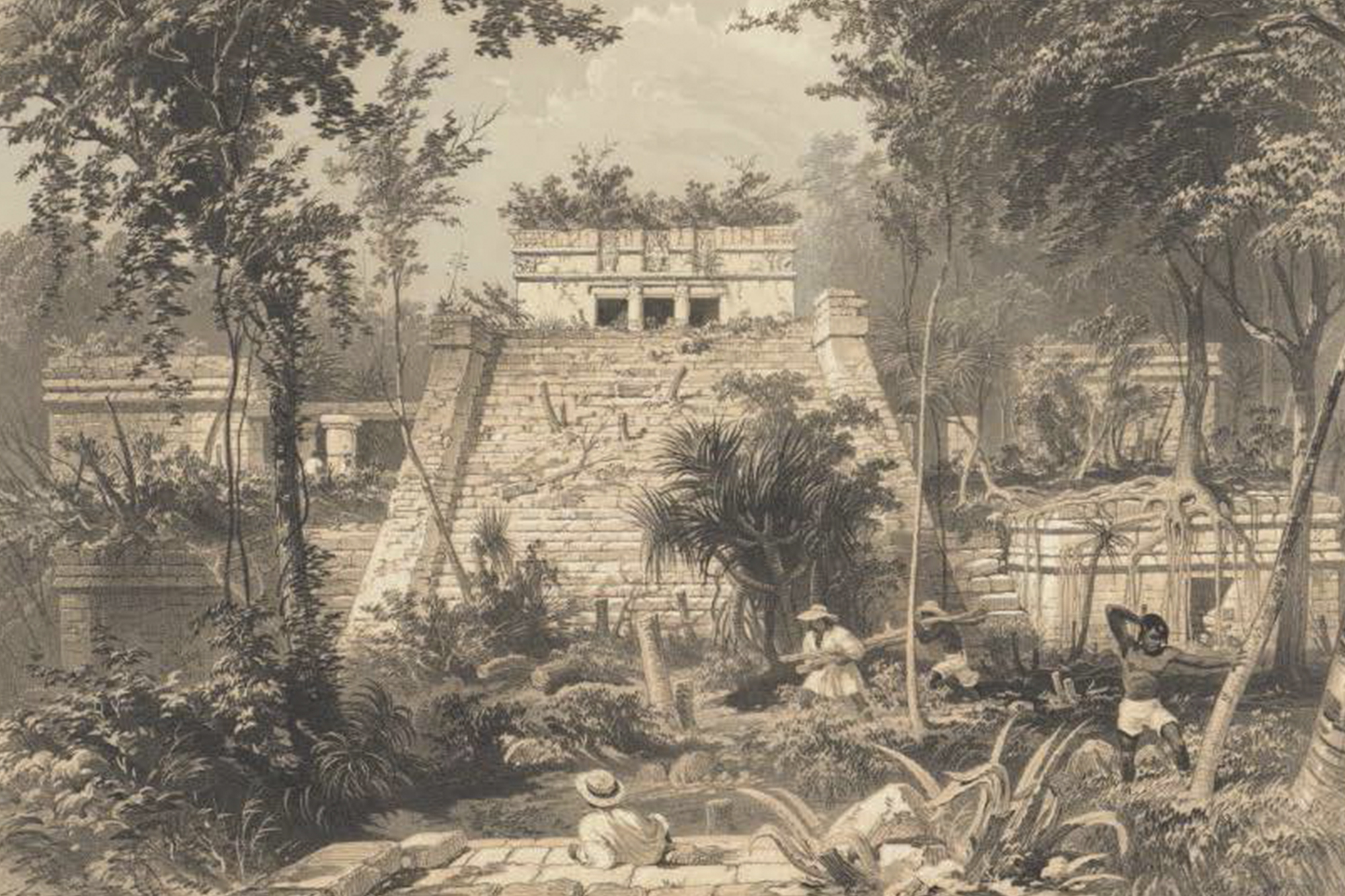
Main temple at Tulum, lithograph in 1844 by Frederick Catherwood.

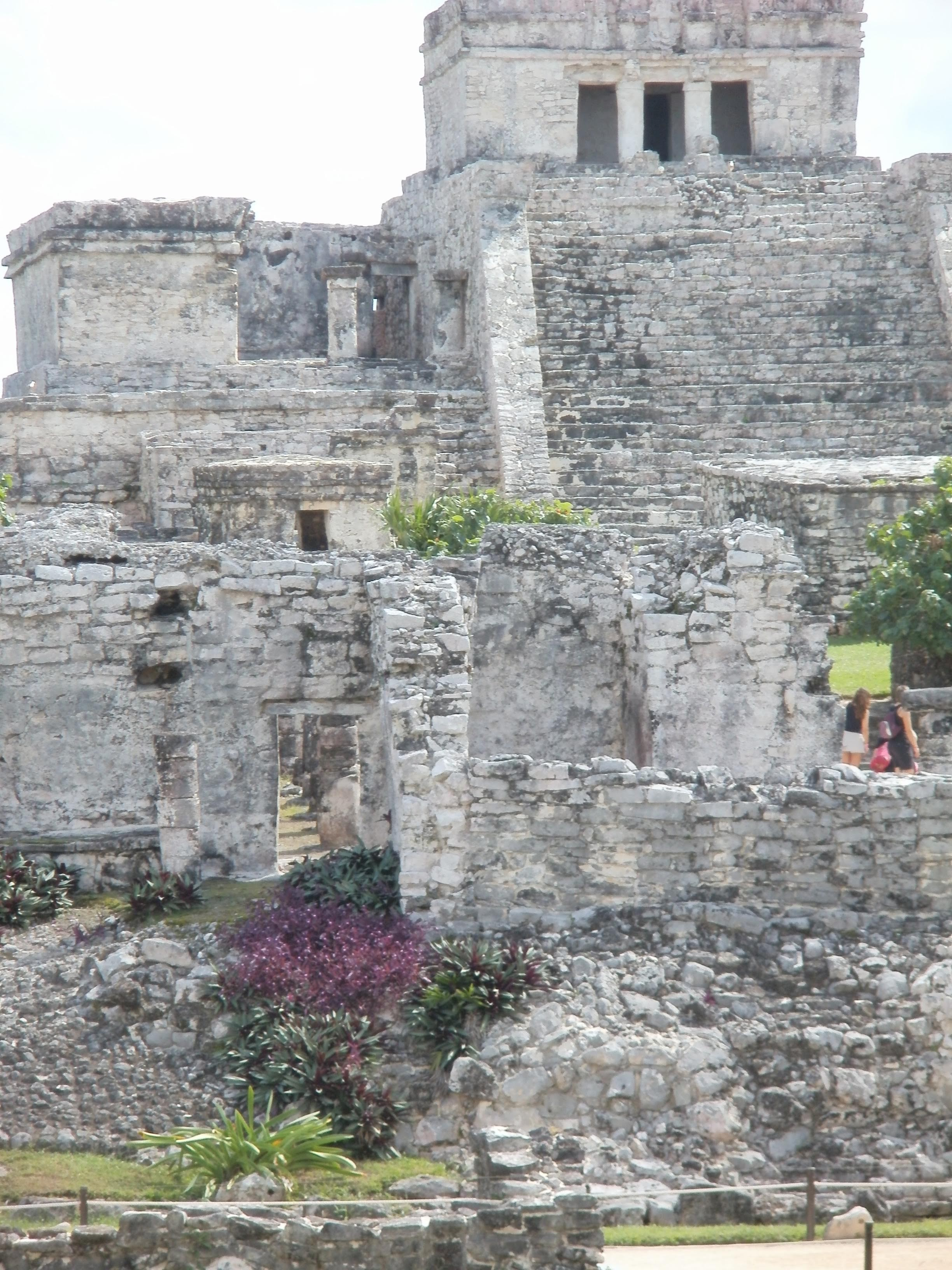
View to the top of El Castillo

The site might have been called Zama, meaning City of Dawn, because it faces the sunrise. Tulum stands on a bluff facing east toward the Caribbean Sea. Tulúm is also the Yucatán Mayan word for fence, wall or trench. The walls surrounding the site allowed the Tulum fort to be defended against invasions. Tulum had access to both land and sea trade routes, making it an important trade hub, especially for obsidian. From numerous depictions in murals and other works around the site, Tulum appears to have been an important site for the worship of the Diving or Descending god.

Tulum was first mentioned by Juan Díaz, a member of Juan de Grijalva's Spanish expedition of 1518, the first Europeans to spot Tulum. The first detailed description of the ruins was published by John Lloyd Stephens and Frederick Catherwood in 1843 in the book Incidents of Travel in Yucatan. As they arrived from the sea, Stephens and Catherwood first saw a tall building that impressed them greatly, most likely the great Castillo of the site. They made accurate maps of the site's walls, and Catherwood made sketches of the Castillo and several other buildings. Stephens and Catherwood also reported an early classic stele at the site, with an inscribed date of AD 564 (now in the British Museum's collection). This has been interpreted as meaning that the stele was likely built elsewhere and brought to Tulum to be reused.

Work conducted at Tulum continued with that of Sylvanus Morley and George P. Howe, beginning in 1913. They worked to restore and open the public beaches. The work was continued by the Carnegie Institution from 1916 to 1922, Samuel Lothrop in 1924 who also mapped the site, Miguel Ángel Fernández in the late 1930s and early 1940s, William Sanders in 1956, and then later in the 1970s by Arthur G. Miller. Through these later investigations done by Sanders and Miller, it has been determined that Tulum was occupied during the late Postclassic period around AD 1200. The site continued to be occupied until contact with the Spanish was made in the early 16th century. The site was abandoned by the end of the 16th century.

In 2016, an underwater archaeological expedition led by Jerónimo Avilés exploring the cenote cave system discovered the skeleton of a female about 30 years of age that may be at least 9,900 years old. According to craniometric measurements, the skull is believed to conform to the mesocephalic pattern, like the other three skulls found in Tulum caves. Three different scars on the skull of the woman showed that she was hit with something hard and her skull bones were broken. Her skull also had crater-like deformations and tissue deformities that appeared to be caused by a bacterial relative of syphilis.

The newly discovered skeleton was 140 meters away from the Chan Hol 2 site. Although archeologists assumed the divers found the remains of the missing Chan Hol 2, the analysis proved that these assumptions were erroneous in a short time. Stinnesbeck compared the new bones to old photographs of Chan Hol 2 and showed that the two skeletons represent different individuals.

Due to their distinctive features, study co-researcher Samuel Rennie suggest the existence of at least two morphologically diverse groups of people living separately in Mexico during the transition from Pleistocene to Holocene.

== Architecture ==
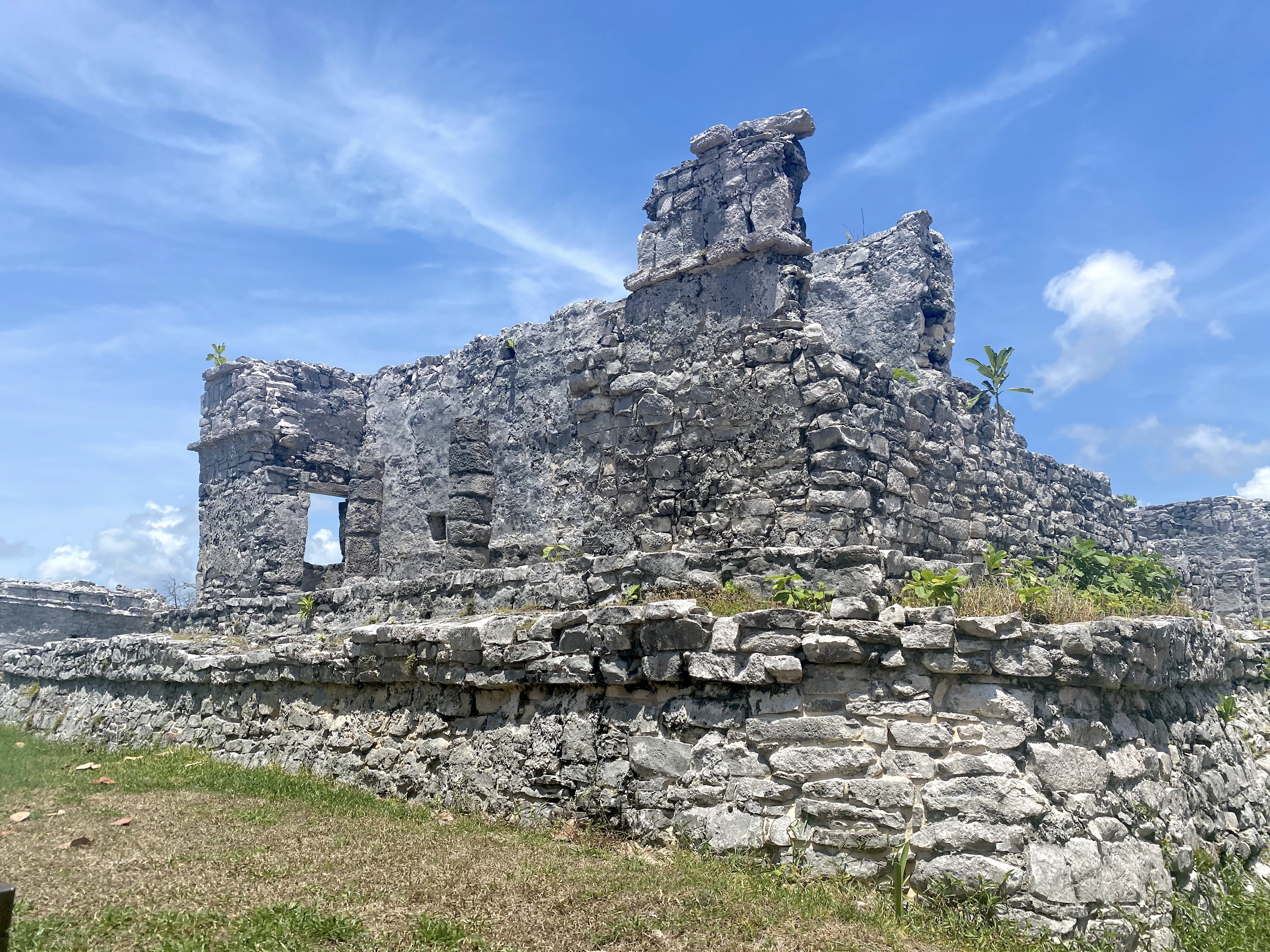
Mayan ruin at archeological site in Tulum

Tulum has architecture typical of Maya sites on the east coast of the Yucatán Peninsula. This architecture is recognized by a step running around the base of the building, which sits on a low substructure. Doorways of this type are usually narrow, with columns used as support if the building is big enough. As the walls flare out there are usually two sets of molding near the top. The room usually contains one or two small windows with an altar at the back wall, roofed by either a beam-and-rubble ceiling or being vaulted. This type of architecture resembles what can be found in the nearby Chichen Itza, just on a much smaller scale.

=== Tulum's wall ===
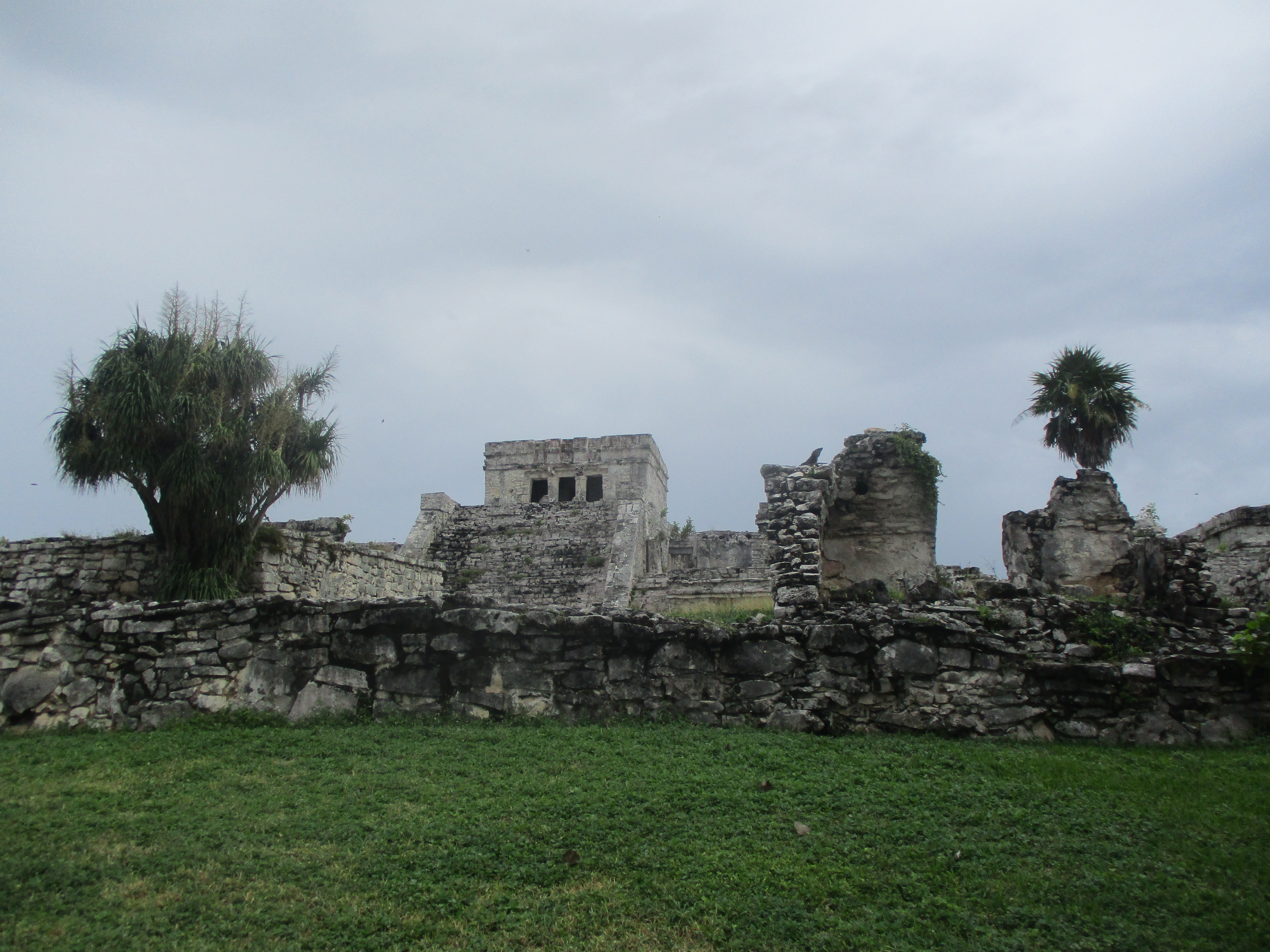
Pyramid El Castillo (The Castle), 2022

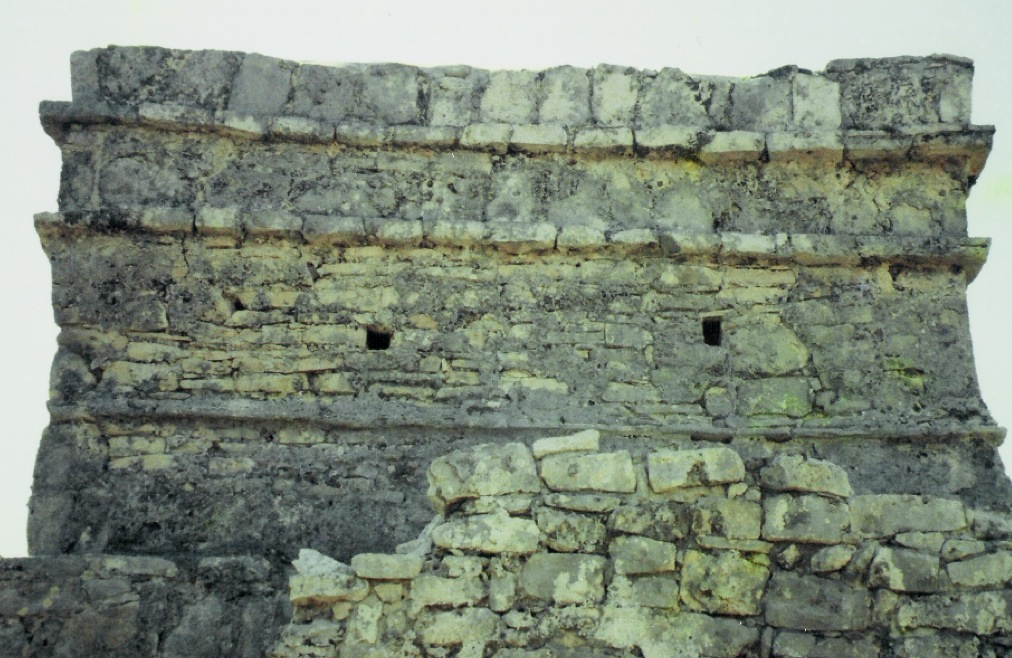
Windows in El Castillo's sea-facing wall

Tulum was protected on one side by steep sea cliffs and on the landward side by a wall that averaged about 3–5 meters (10–16 ft) in height. The wall also was about 8 m (26 ft) thick and 400 m (1,300 ft) long on the side parallel to the sea. The part of the wall that ran the width of the site was slightly shorter and only about 170 meters (560 ft) on both sides. Constructing this massive wall would have taken an enormous amount of energy and time, which shows how important defense was to the Maya when they chose this site. On the southwest and northwest corners there are small structures that have been identified as watch towers, showing again how well defended the city was. There are five narrow gateways in the wall with two each on the north and south sides and one on the west. The seaward side is protected by the steep cliffs, except for one small cove with a sandy beach. It was in this small cove where the canoes would return from trading and fishing. Near the northern side of the wall a small cenote provided the city with fresh water. It is this impressive wall that makes Tulum one of the most well-known fortified sites of the Maya.

Urbanistically, the intramural precinct features elevated sacbeob (raised causeways) that directed civic-ceremonial traffic between the primary temples and the residential platforms, reflecting Late Postclassic East Coast architectural planning.

=== Most famous buildings ===
There are three major structures of interest at the Tulum archeological site. El Castillo, the Temple of the Frescoes, and the Temple of the Descending God.

==== Temple of the Frescoes ====
Among the more spectacular buildings here is the Temple of the Frescoes that included a lower gallery and a smaller second story gallery. The Temple of the Frescoes was used as an observatory for tracking the movements of the sun. Niched figurines of the Maya "diving god" or Venus deity decorate the facade of the temple. This "diving god" is also depicted in the Temple of the Diving God in the central precinct of the site. Above the entrance in the western wall a stucco figure of the "diving god" is still preserved, giving the temple its name. A mural can still be seen on the eastern wall that resembles that of a style that originated in highland Mexico, called the Mixteca-Puebla style, though visitors are no longer permitted to enter.

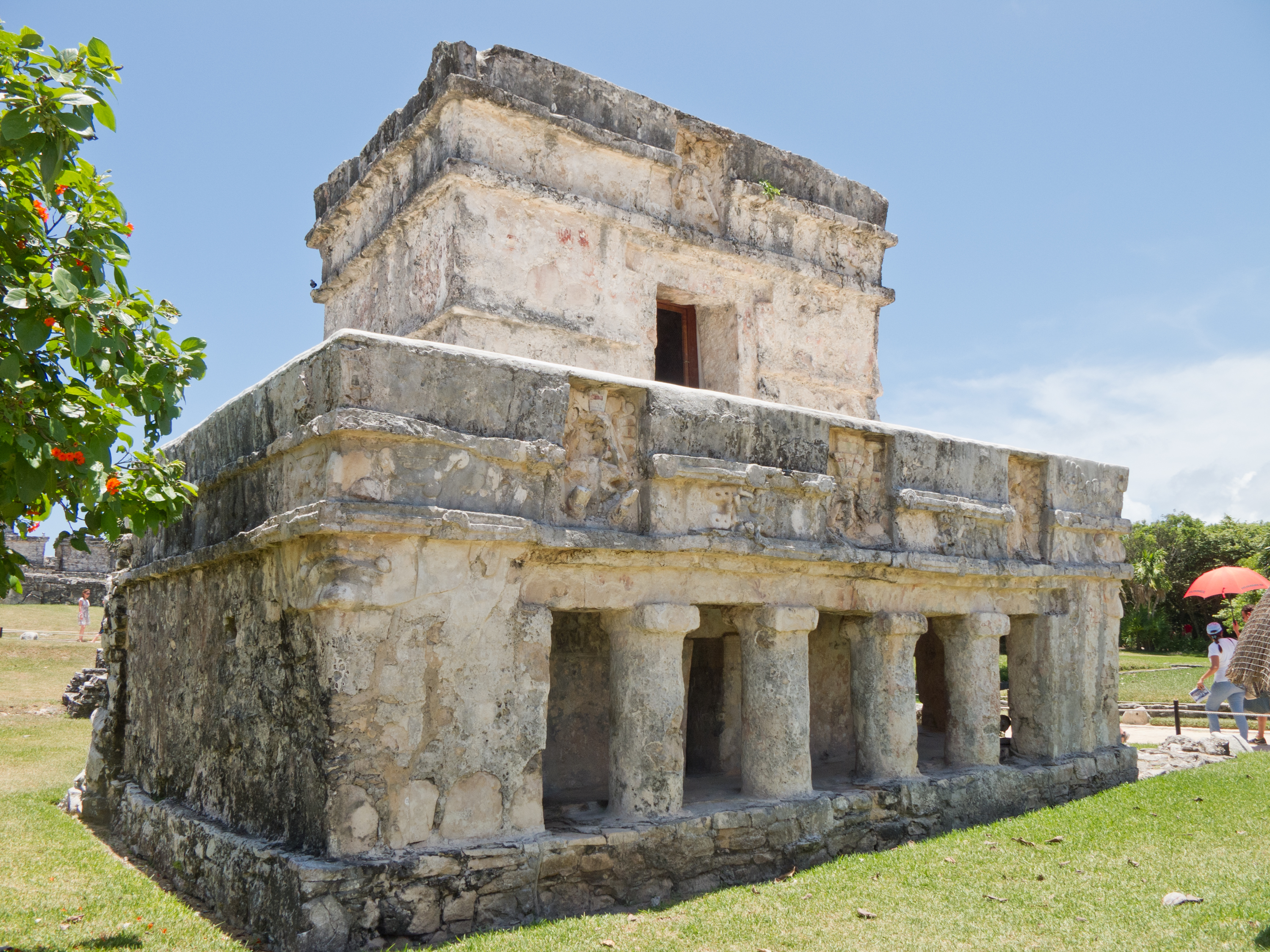
Temple of the Frescos

==== Temple of the Descending God ====
The Temple of the Descending God consists of a single room with a door to the west and a narrow staircase that was built on top of another temple that served as its base.

In the niche located at the top of the door stands a sculpture that's found throughout Tulum. He has wings, a headdress, and holds an object in his hands.

==== El Castillo ====
Also in the central precinct is the pyramid, which is 7.5 m (25 ft) tall. The Castillo was built on a previous building that was colonnaded and had a beam and mortar roof. The lintels in the upper rooms have serpent motifs carved into them. The construction of the Castillo appears to have taken place in stages. A small shrine appears to have been used as a beacon for incoming canoes. This shrine marks a break in the barrier reef that is opposite the site. Here there is a cove and landing beach in a break in the sea cliffs that would have been perfect for trading canoes coming in. This characteristic of the site may be one of the reasons the Maya founded the city of Tulum exactly here, as Tulum later became a prominent trading port during the late Postclassic.

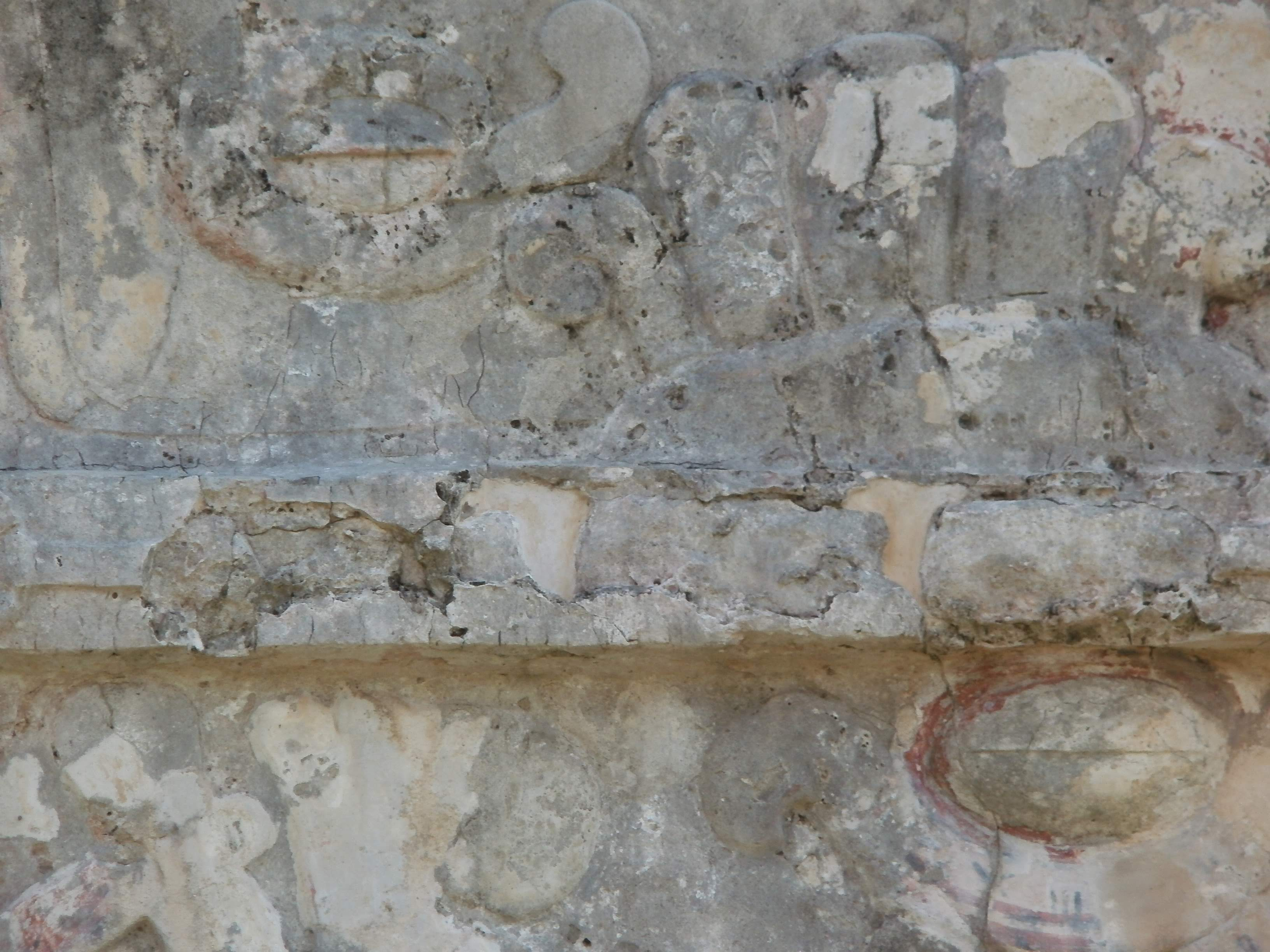
Detail of building at Tulum

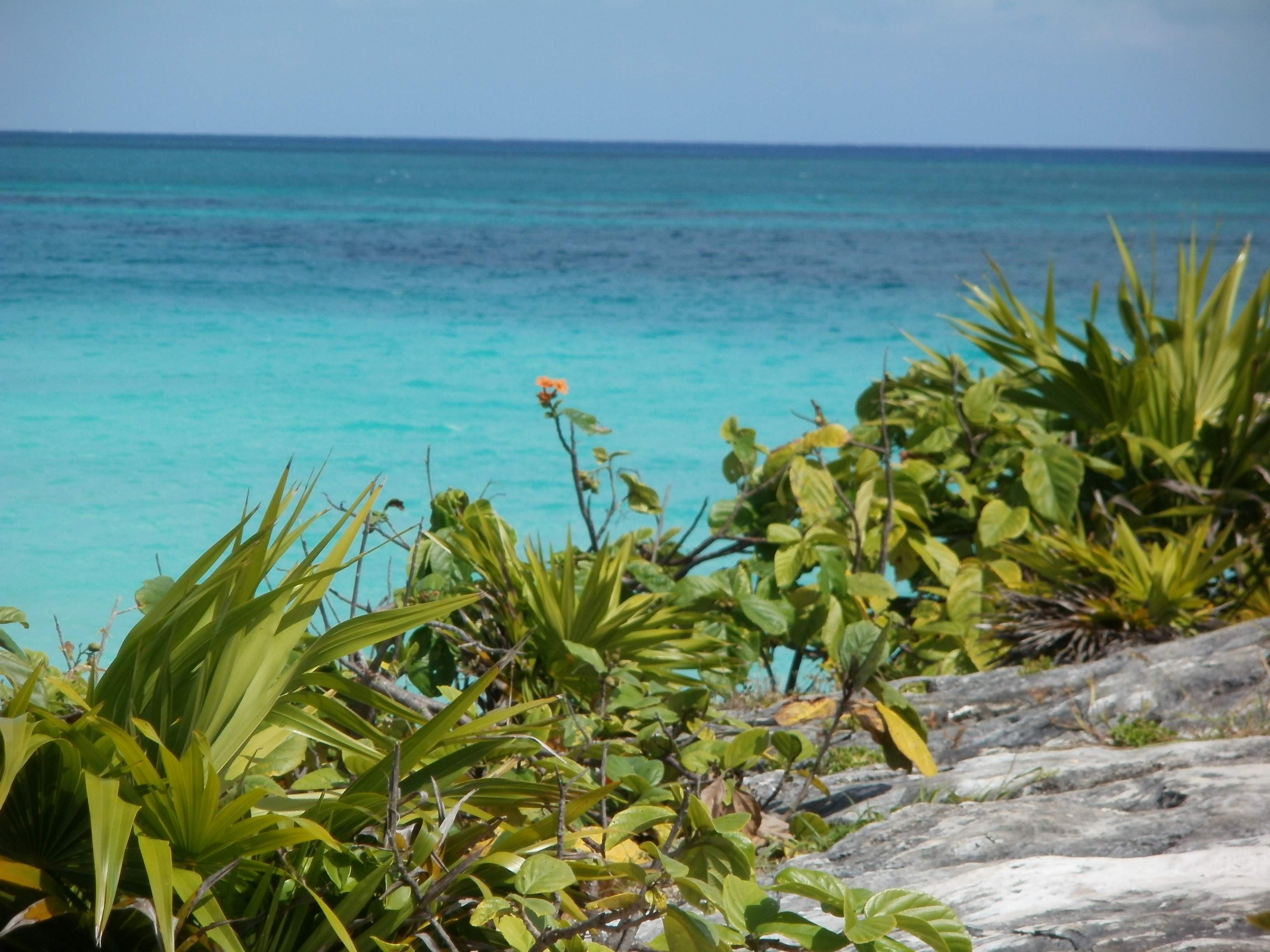
View of ocean from Tulum site

== Trading ==
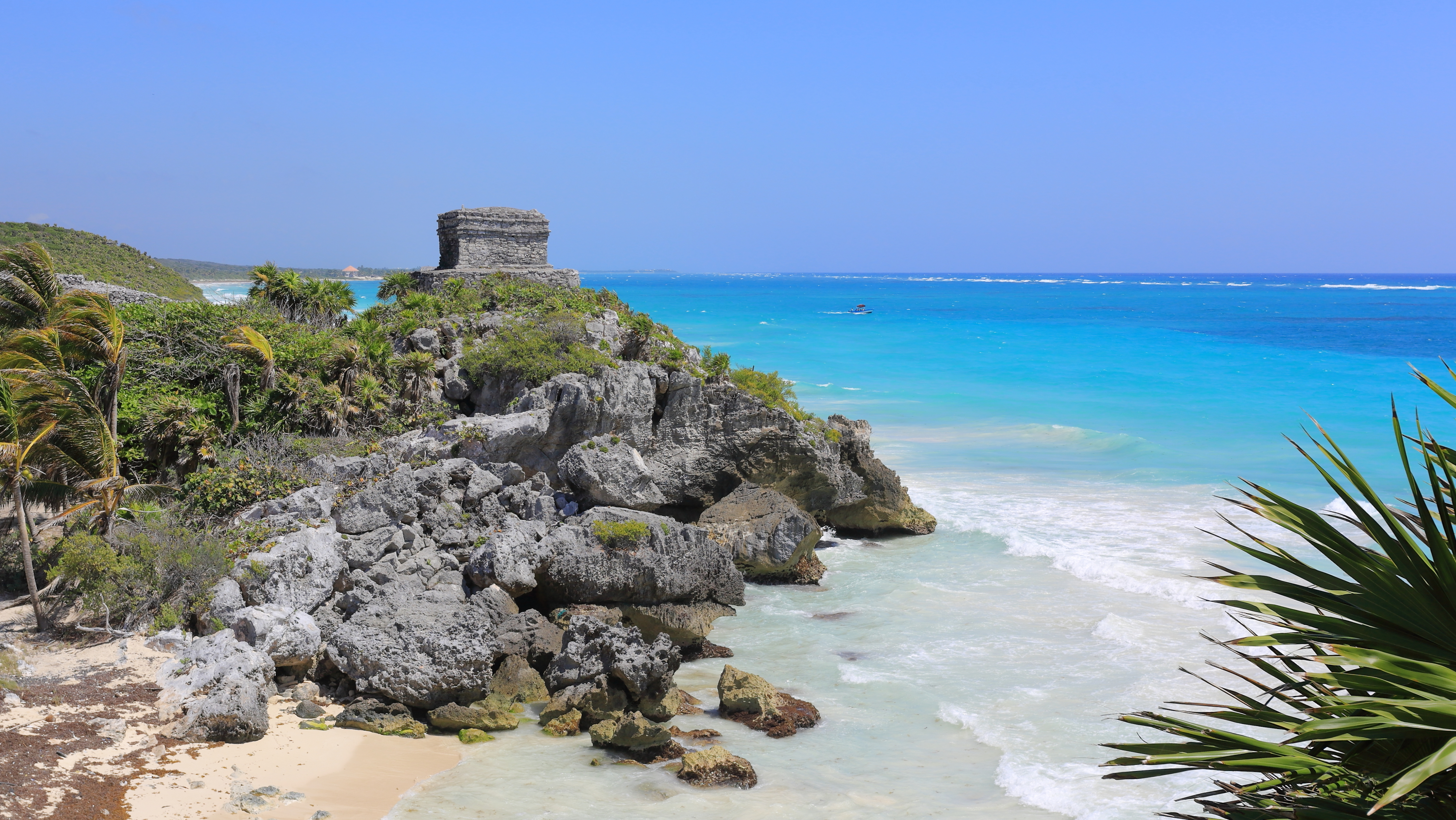
Templo Dios del Viento (God of Winds Temple) guarding Tulum's sea entrance bay

Both coastal and land routes converged at Tulum. A number of artifacts found in or near the site show contacts with areas all over Central Mexico and Central America. Copper artifacts from the Mexican highlands have been found near the site, as have flint artifacts, ceramics, incense burners, and gold objects from all over the Yucatán. Salt and textiles were among some of the goods brought by traders to Tulum by sea that would be dispersed inland. Typical exported goods included feathers and copper objects that came from inland sources. These goods could be transported by sea to rivers such as the Río Motagua and the Río Usumacincta/Pasión system, which could be traveled inland, giving seafaring canoes access to both the highlands and the lowlands.

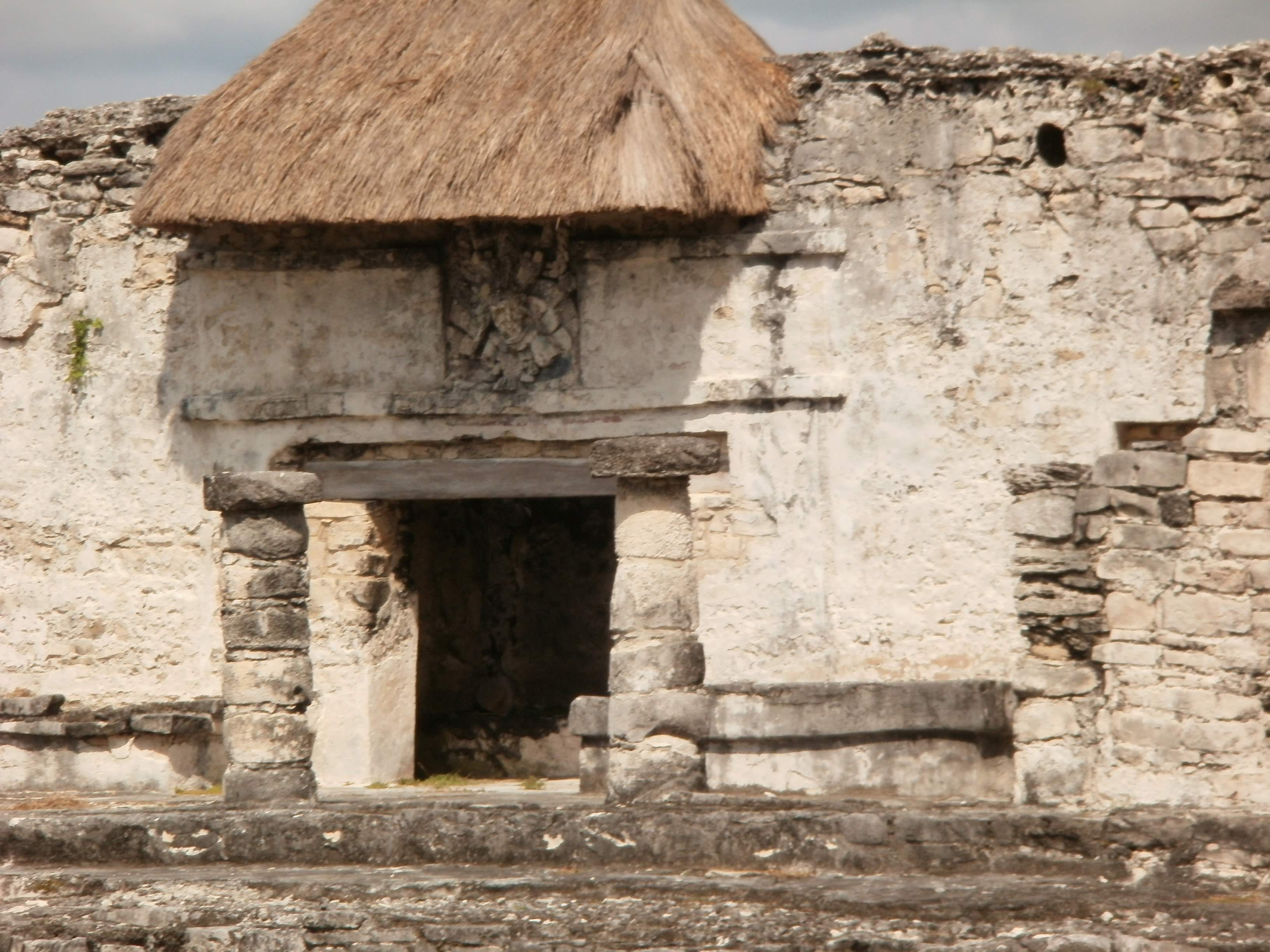
Thatched awning on building at Tulum

The Río Motagua starts from the highlands of Guatemala and empties into the Caribbean. The Río Pasión/Ucamacincta river system also originates in the Guatemalan highlands and empties into the Gulf of Mexico. It may have been one of these seafaring canoes that Christopher Columbus first encountered off the shores of the Bay Islands of Honduras. Jade and obsidian appear to be some of the more valuable found here. The obsidian would have been brought from Ixtepeque in northern Guatemala, which was nearly 700 kilometers (430 mi) away from Tulum. This huge distance, coupled with the density of obsidian found at the site, show that Tulum was a major center for the trading of obsidian.

== Tourism ==
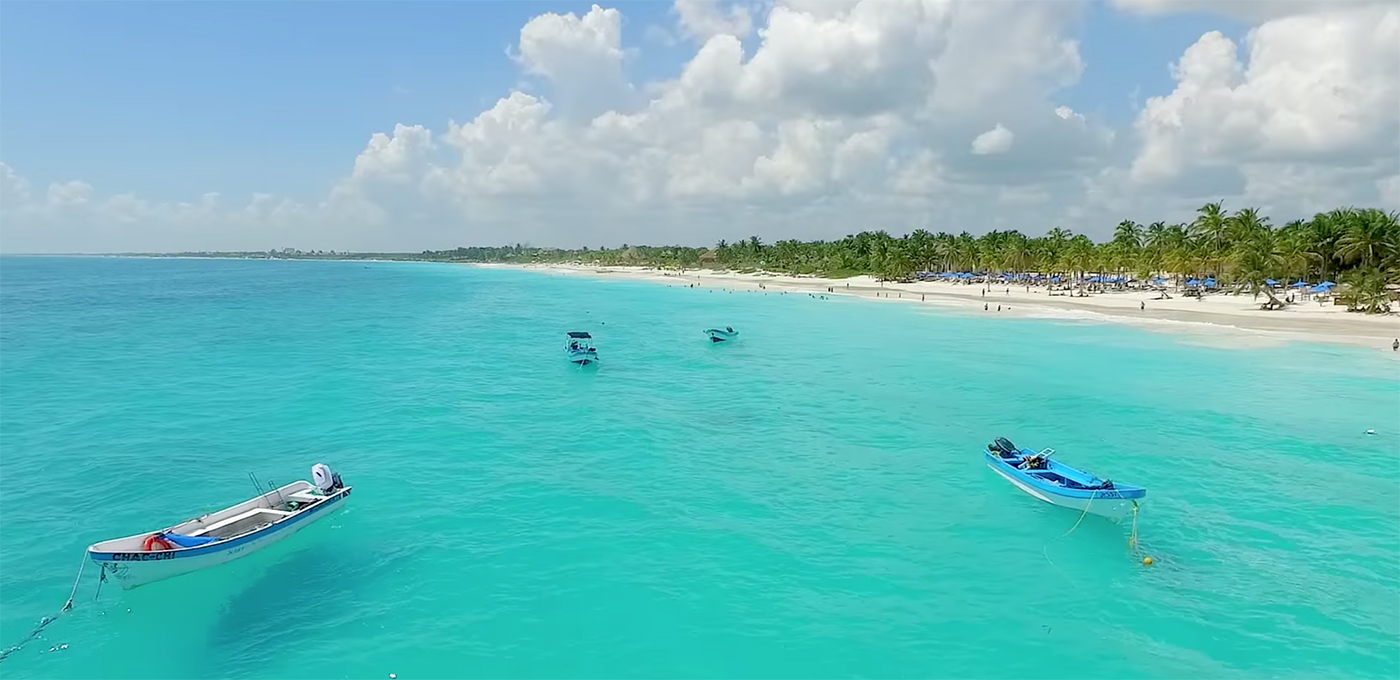
One of the Tulum beaches

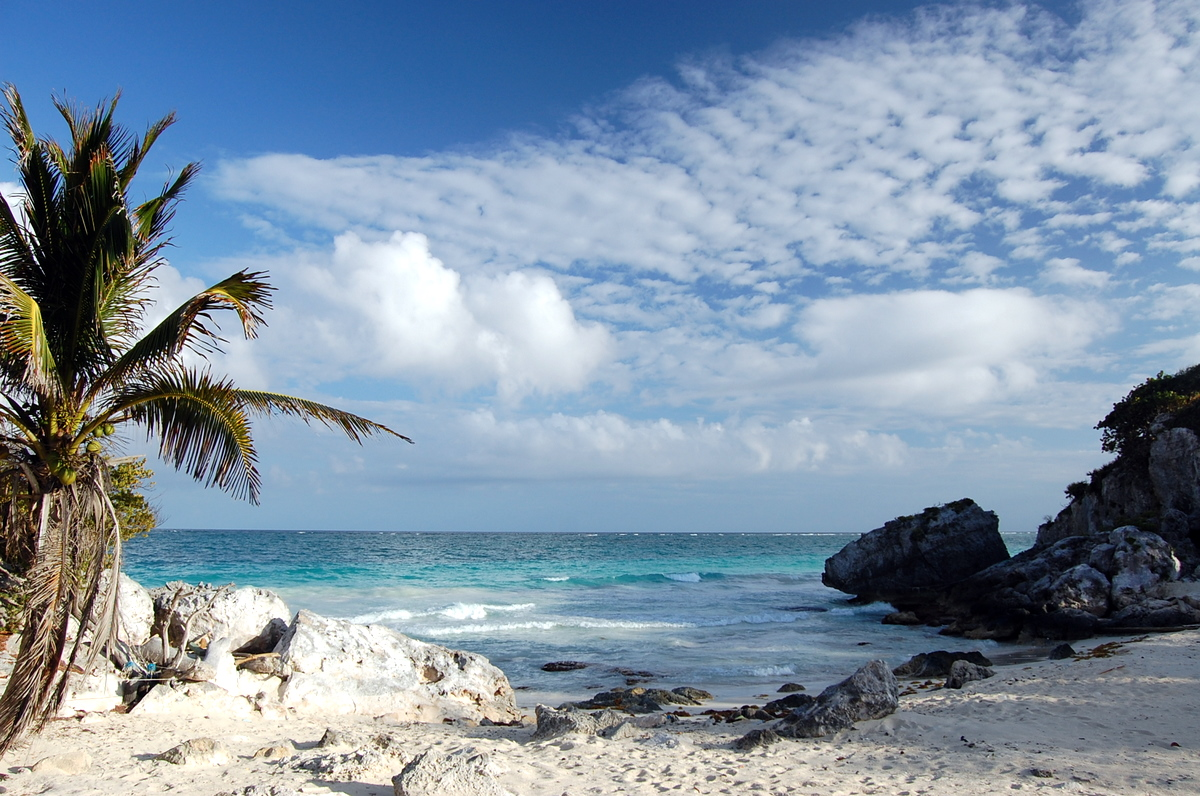
This beach at Tulum is protected for nesting sea turtles.

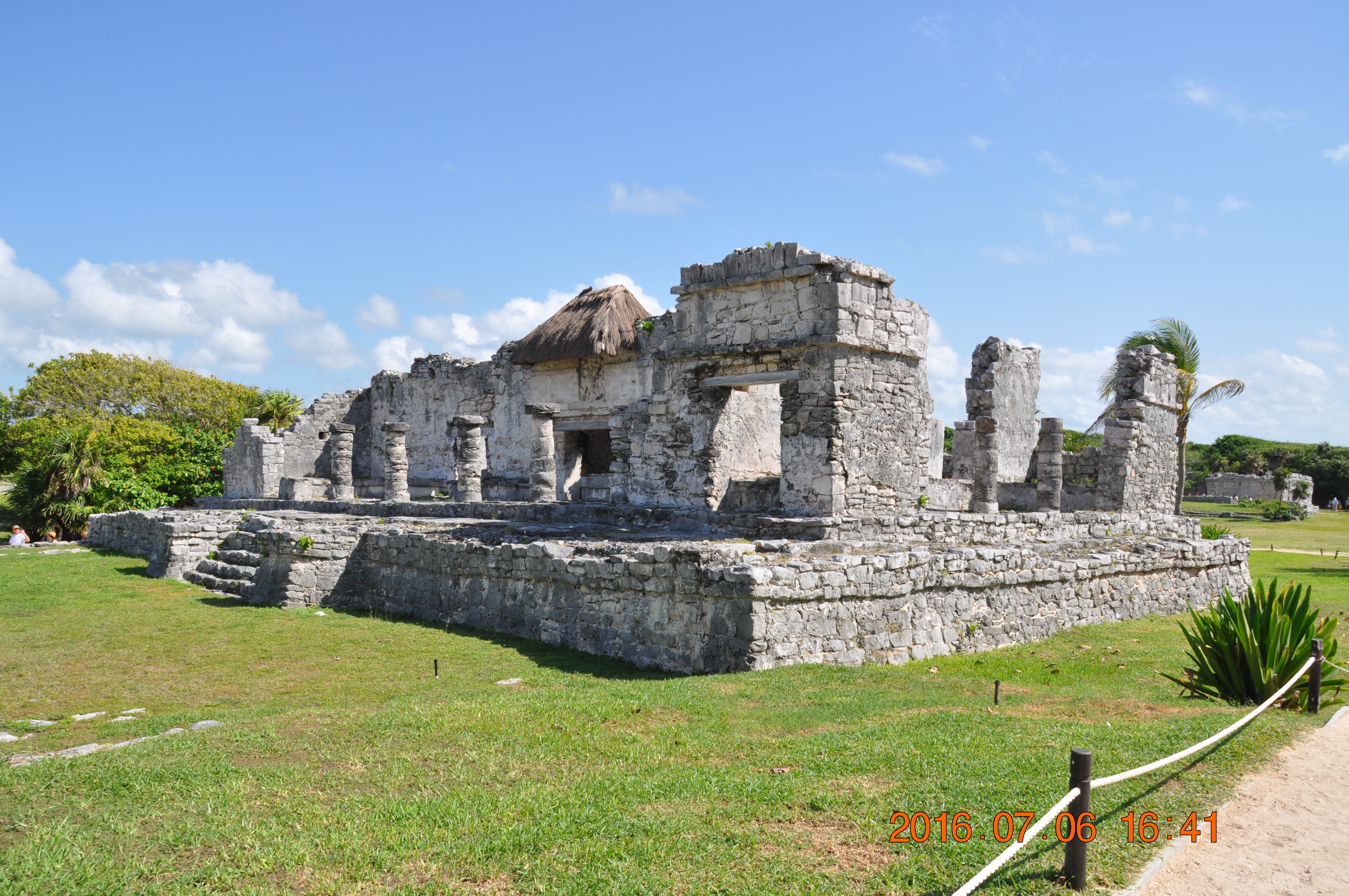
Part of the ruins of Tulum

Tulum archaeological site is relatively compact compared with many other Maya sites in the vicinity, and is one of the best-preserved coastal Maya sites. Its proximity to the modern tourism developments along the Mexican Caribbean coastline and its short distance from Cancún and the surrounding "Riviera Maya" has made it a popular Maya tourist site in the Yucatán Península. Daily tour buses bring a constant stream of visitors to the site. The Tulum ruins are the third most-visited archeological site in Mexico, after Teotihuacan and Chichen Itza, receiving over 2.2 million visitors in 2017.

A large number of cenotes are located in the Tulum area such as Maya Blue, Naharon, Temple of Doom, Tortuga, Vacaha, Grand Cenote, Abejas, Nohoch Kiin, Calavera, and Zacil-Ha.

Tulum has some of the best beaches in Mexico. Most popular beaches in Tulum are Playa Paraiso, Playa Ruinas, Playa Akumal, Papaya Playa and more. CV Villas researchers named Tulum beaches with the whitest sand, 1.4 points off the whitest shade from over 200 beaches worldwide.

The tourist destination is now divided into six main areas: the archeological site, the Pueblo (or town), the Zona Hotelera (or hotel zone along the seafront), Aldea Zama (south of Pueblo), La Veleta (south-west of Pueblo), and the biosphere reserve of Sian Ka'an.

The impact of tourism on Tulum is a subject of growing controversy. Director Rachel Appel filmed a documentary entitled "The Dark Side of Tulum" in 2018 as an exposé of the environmental impacts of the local tourist industry.

== Safety ==
According to the crime statistics provided by Numbeo, Tulum is considered a safe destination for most tourists. The primary safety concerns in the area typically revolve around natural occurrences such as hurricanes during the months of June to October.

== Climate ==
Considered a tropical savanna climate typically with a pronounced dry season. The Köppen Climate Classification subtype for this climate is Aw (Tropical Savanna Climate).

Climate data for Tulum, Mexico (1951–2010)
Month	Jan	Feb	Mar	Apr	May	Jun	Jul	Aug	Sep	Oct	Nov	Dec	Year
Record high °C (°F)	37.5 (99.5)	39.0 (102.2)	41.5 (106.7)	42.0 (107.6)	43.0 (109.4)	45.0 (113.0)	40.0 (104.0)	44.0 (111.2)	41.0 (105.8)	39.0 (102.2)	39.5 (103.1)	37.0 (98.6)	45.0 (113.0)
Mean daily maximum °C (°F)	29.3 (84.7)	29.8 (85.6)	30.9 (87.6)	31.4 (88.5)	32.2 (90.0)	32.0 (89.6)	32.3 (90.1)	32.4 (90.3)	31.8 (89.2)	31.2 (88.2)	30.5 (86.9)	29.4 (84.9)	31.1 (88.0)
Daily mean °C (°F)	23.5 (74.3)	24.0 (75.2)	25.4 (77.7)	26.2 (79.2)	27.0 (80.6)	27.2 (81.0)	27.0 (80.6)	27.1 (80.8)	26.6 (79.9)	25.9 (78.6)	24.9 (76.8)	23.8 (74.8)	25.7 (78.3)
Mean daily minimum °C (°F)	17.8 (64.0)	18.2 (64.8)	19.8 (67.6)	21.1 (70.0)	21.8 (71.2)	22.5 (72.5)	21.7 (71.1)	21.7 (71.1)	21.4 (70.5)	20.6 (69.1)	19.4 (66.9)	18.2 (64.8)	20.4 (68.7)
Record low °C (°F)	7.0 (44.6)	4.3 (39.7)	7.2 (45.0)	7.1 (44.8)	8.2 (46.8)	11.2 (52.2)	9.0 (48.2)	10.0 (50.0)	5.3 (41.5)	4.4 (39.9)	9.0 (48.2)	7.0 (44.6)	4.3 (39.7)
Average precipitation mm (inches)	60.7 (2.39)	48.3 (1.90)	31.2 (1.23)	38.8 (1.53)	103.6 (4.08)	156.5 (6.16)	102.0 (4.02)	101.7 (4.00)	167.2 (6.58)	178.1 (7.01)	83.7 (3.30)	65.0 (2.56)	1,136.8 (44.76)
Average precipitation days (≥ 0.1 mm)	7.2	4.7	3.3	3.3	6.1	9.7	8.5	9.1	12.8	11.4	8.5	7.1	91.7
Source: Servicio Meteorologico Nacional

== See also ==
- Juan de Grijalva
- Juan Díaz (Spanish conquistador)
- Riviera Maya
- Topoxte
- Montejo expedition – to Zamá in 1527
