= Eve of Naharon =

Hominin fossil

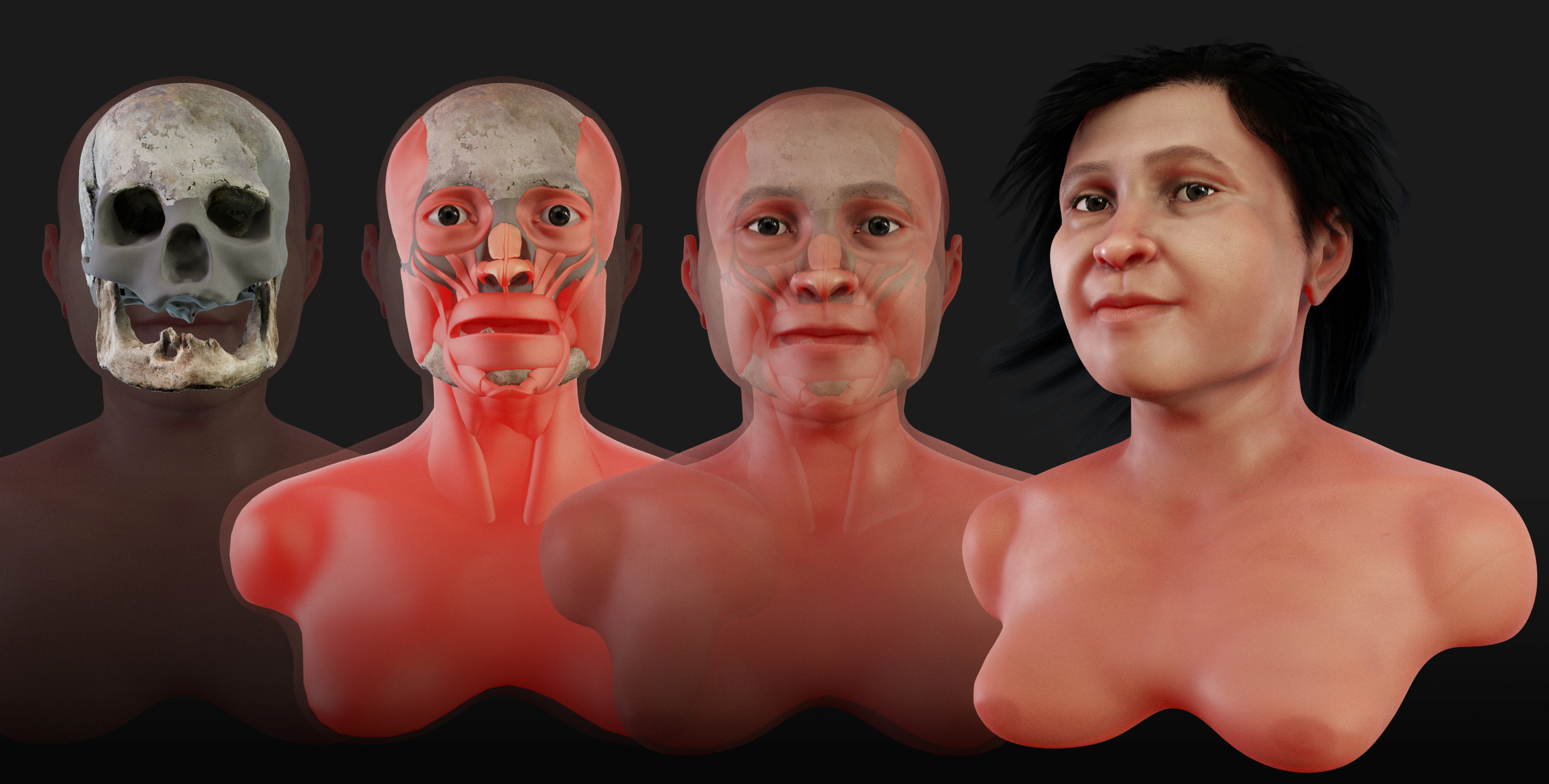
Woman of Naharon - steps forensic facial reconstruction by Cícero Moraes, 2018

Eve of Naharon (Spanish: Eva de Naharon) is the skeleton of a 20– to 25-year-old human female found in the Naharon section of the underwater cave Sistema Naranjal in Mexico near the town of Tulum, around 80 miles (130 km) southwest of Cancún. The Naranjal subsystem is a part of the larger Sistema Ox Bel Ha. The skeleton is carbon dated to 13,600 years ago, which makes it one of the oldest documented human finds in the Americas.

Other skeletons found within the cave are said to be between 11,000 and 14,000 years old. Whilst radiocarbon dating might be inaccurate due to the marine effect, similar results have been obtained by uranium–thorium dating.

== Discovery ==
The remains of Eve of Naharon were discovered and reported to the National Institute of Anthropology and History (INAH) by Octavio del Río in 2000 during the archaeological exploration of Naharon, a cenote located 80 miles (130 km) southwest of Cancun. The project, co-directed by Arturo Gonzales, Carmen Rojas, and Octavio del Río, was part of the first archaeological catalog of cenotes and caves in Quintana Roo. Later, the project grew to an archeological atlas that included all of the known cenotes in the Yucatan Peninsula. González, director of the Desert Museum in Saltillo, Mexico said, "We don't know how [the people whose remains were found in the caves] arrived and whether they came from the Atlantic, the jungle, or inside the continent, but we believe these finds are the oldest yet to be found in the Americas and may influence our theories of how the first people arrived." González and his team spent a total of four years excavating the remains, and their discovery raised questions as to where the first Americans may have originated.

== Significance ==
According to Arturo González, the director of the Desert Museum in Saltillo, Mexico, and the lead archaeologist of this project, the bone structure of the skeleton is more consistent with that of people from Southern Asia than that of people from Northern Asia.

This similarity with Southern Asian skeletal types has called into question the timeline and geographic origin in the current theory of New World settlement by peoples from Northern Asia.

This implies that people may not have come to America from North Asia through a land bridge which is now underwater as previously thought, as many scientists believe that the first peoples of America arrived by land and by sea in coast-hugging canoes from Northern Asia across what is now the Bering Strait.

The first peoples filtered into the Americas from Asia in Paleolithic times, possibly continuing to arrive until around 10,000 BCE, when melting glaciers submerged the land bridge and isolated the American continents from the rest of the world.

== See also ==
- Chan Hol
- Naia (skeleton)
- Quintana Roo Speleological Survey
- Sistema Ox Bel Ha
