= Chan Hol =

Archaeological site in Quintana Roo, Mexico

- Location in Mexico Chan Hol (Mexico)
- 20°9′N 87°34′W
- Location: Quintana Roo, Mexico

Chan Hol, part of the Toh ha cave system, is a cenote and submerged cave system in Quintana Roo, Mexico, of interest to paleoanthropologists. The remains of three prehistoric human fossils were discovered within the cave system. Along with Eve of Naharon, Naia, the Man of El Templo and the Woman of Las Palmas, the three fossils at Chan Hol are among several ancient Paleo-Indian skeletons found in the submerged cave systems of the Yucatán Peninsula around Tulum, Quintana Roo.

== Description ==
Chan Hol is derived from Mayan, meaning "little hole". The Chan Hol cave system extends over 5,000 m (16,404 ft) in length. The entrance, via the cenote, is located around 15 km (9 mi) away from Tulum and around 11.5 km (7 mi) from the modern coastline. As the sea level was over 100 m (328 ft) lower than it is today, the cave system was dry during the Late Pleistocene. During the Late Pleistocene, the Yucatán region was likely composed of dry savanna, grassland and even desert.

== Human fossils ==
The skeletons of first two ancient Paleo-Indians were discovered within the Chan Hol cave system. Both skeletons exhibit sinodont dental morphology.

=== Chan Hol I ===
The first fossil, Chan Hol I, was discovered in 2006 by Alexandra and Thorsten Kampe at a location in the cave system around 530 m (1,739 ft) northeast of the cenote entrance, at a depth of around 8 m (26 ft) underwater. Nicknamed El Joven, the fossil is dated to around 9194-8792 BP. The skeleton had fossilized while the cave system was still dry. The skeleton shows evidence of intentional placement of the dead body.

=== Chan Hol II ===
The second fossil, Chan Hol II, was discovered in 2009 by Harry Gust at a location in the cave system around 1,240 m (4,068 ft) southwest of the cenote entrance, at a depth of around 8.5 m (28 ft) underwater. In February 2012, photos of the skeleton spread on social media. In March 2012, the site was vandalized and looted. Most of the skeletal remains, including the skull, were stolen. In October 2012, researchers collected the leftover fossil fragments from the site. Although Chan Hol II was given the nickname La Niña, later osteological analysis shows that the remains likely belonged to a young male. The fossil is dated to around 11,311 BP. The individual had died while the cave system was still dry.

=== Chan Hol III ===
The third fossil, Chan Hol III, was discovered in 2016 by divers Iván Hernández and Vicente Fito led by Jerónimo Avilés Olguín. The skeleton was discovered in a low cave tunnel in fresh water at 8 m (26 ft) water depth, at 1,141 m (3,743 ft) diving distance from the cenote entrance. Nicknamed Ixchel after the Maya goddess of fertility. The fossil is a 30-year-old woman who lived around 10,000 years ago. The skull shows evidence of various traumas and possibly signs of a disease that may have driven her tribe to kill her.

According to craniometric measurements, the skull is believed to conform to the mesocephalic pattern, like the other three skulls found in Tulum caves. Three different scars on the skull of the woman showed that she was hit with something hard and her skull bones were broken. Her skull also had crater-like deformations and tissue deformities that appeared to be caused by a bacterial relative of syphilis.

According to study lead researcher Wolfgang Stinnesbeck, "It really looks as if this woman had a very hard time and an extremely unhappy end of her life. Obviously, this is speculative, but given the traumas and the pathological deformations on her skull, it appears a likely scenario that she may have been expelled from her group and was killed in the cave, or was left in the cave to die there". The newly discovered skeleton was 140 m (460 ft) away from the Chan Hol 2 site. Although archaeologists assumed the divers found the remains of the missing Chan Hol 2, the analysis proved that these assumptions were erroneous in a short time. Stinnesbeck compared the new bones to old photographs of Chan Hol 2 and showed that the two skeletons represent different individuals.

Due to their distinctive features, study co-researcher Samuel Rennie suggest the existence of at least two morphologically diverse groups of people living separately in Mexico during the transition from Pleistocene to Holocene.
