= Naia (skeleton) =

Human fossil from the Yucatán Peninsula, Mexico

Naia (designated as HN5/48) is the name (Note: Her name is derived from a type of water nymph in Greek mythology—the Naiads.) given to a 12,000- to 13,000-year-old Paleo-Indian teenage girl whose skeleton was found in the Yucatán Peninsula, Mexico. Her bones were part of a 2007 discovery of a cache of animal bones in a cenote called Hoyo Negro (Spanish for "Black Hole") in the Sistema Sac Actun. At the time of Naia's death, the cave system was mostly dry, and she likely died falling into Hoyo Negro.

The remains have been described as the "oldest, most complete and genetically intact human skeleton in the New World".

== Genetic testing ==
The original report stated that "HN5/48 is among the small group of Paleoamerican skeletons, a group that is morphologically distinct from most Native Americans but within the natural variation of Asian-Pacific populations."

Genetic testing indicated a genetic link between Paleoamericans and modern Indigenous peoples of the Americas as testing found MtDNA haplotype D1. Haplogroup D (mtDNA) is believed to have arisen in Asia. D1 is also found in Central Asia and is one of the founding lineages in the Americas. Subhaplogroup D1 occurs in 10.5% of extant Native Americans, with highest frequency of 29% in Indigenous people from Chile and Argentina.

The report concluded that "HN5/48 shows that the distinctive craniofacial morphology and generalized dentition of Paleoamericans can co-occur with a Beringian derived mtDNA haplogroup. This 13–12 ka Paleoamerican skeleton thus suggests that Paleoamericans represent an early population expansion out of Beringia, not an earlier migration from elsewhere in Eurasia. This is consistent with hypotheses that both Paleoamericans and Native Americans derive from a single source population, whether or not all share a lineal relationship ... the differences in craniofacial form between Native Americans and their Paleoamerican predecessors are best explained as evolutionary changes that postdate the divergence of Beringians from their Siberian ancestors."

Evidence from full genomic studies suggests that the first people in the Americas (both Paleoamericans and later contemporary Native Americans) diverged from Ancient East Asians about 36,000 years ago and expanded northwards into Siberia, where they encountered and interacted with a different Paleolithic Siberian population (known as Ancient North Eurasians), giving rise to both Paleosiberian peoples and Ancient Native Americans, which later migrated towards the Beringian region, became isolated from other populations, and subsequently populated the Americas.

== Impact on the American skull morphology debate ==
A report published in the American Journal of Physical Anthropology in January 2015 looked again at craniofacial variation focusing on differences between early and late Native Americans and explanations for these based on either skull morphology or molecular genetics. Arguments based on molecular genetics have in the main, according to the authors, accepted a single migration from Asia with a probable pause in Beringia, plus later bi-directional gene flow. Studies focusing on craniofacial morphology have argued that Paleoamerican remains have "been described as much closer to Polynesian and Australo-Melanesians populations than to the modern series of Native Americans", suggesting two entries into the Americas, an early one occurring before a distinctive East Asian morphology developed (referred to in the paper as the "Two Components Model").

A third model, the "Recurrent Gene Flow" [RGF] model, attempts to reconcile the two, arguing that circumarctic gene flow after the initial migration could account for morphological changes. Noting that the original report on the Hoyo Negro skeleton supported the RGF model, the authors disagreed with the conclusion that the skull shape did not match those of modern Native Americans, instead arguing that the "skull falls into a subregion of the morphospace occupied by both Paleoamericans and some modern Native Americans."

== See also ==
- Arlington Springs Man – (Human remains)
- Chan Hol
- Eve of Naharon
- List of unsolved deaths
- Kennewick Man – (Human remains)
- Settlement of the Americas
