= San José Mogote =

Pre-Columbian archaeological site of the Zapotec

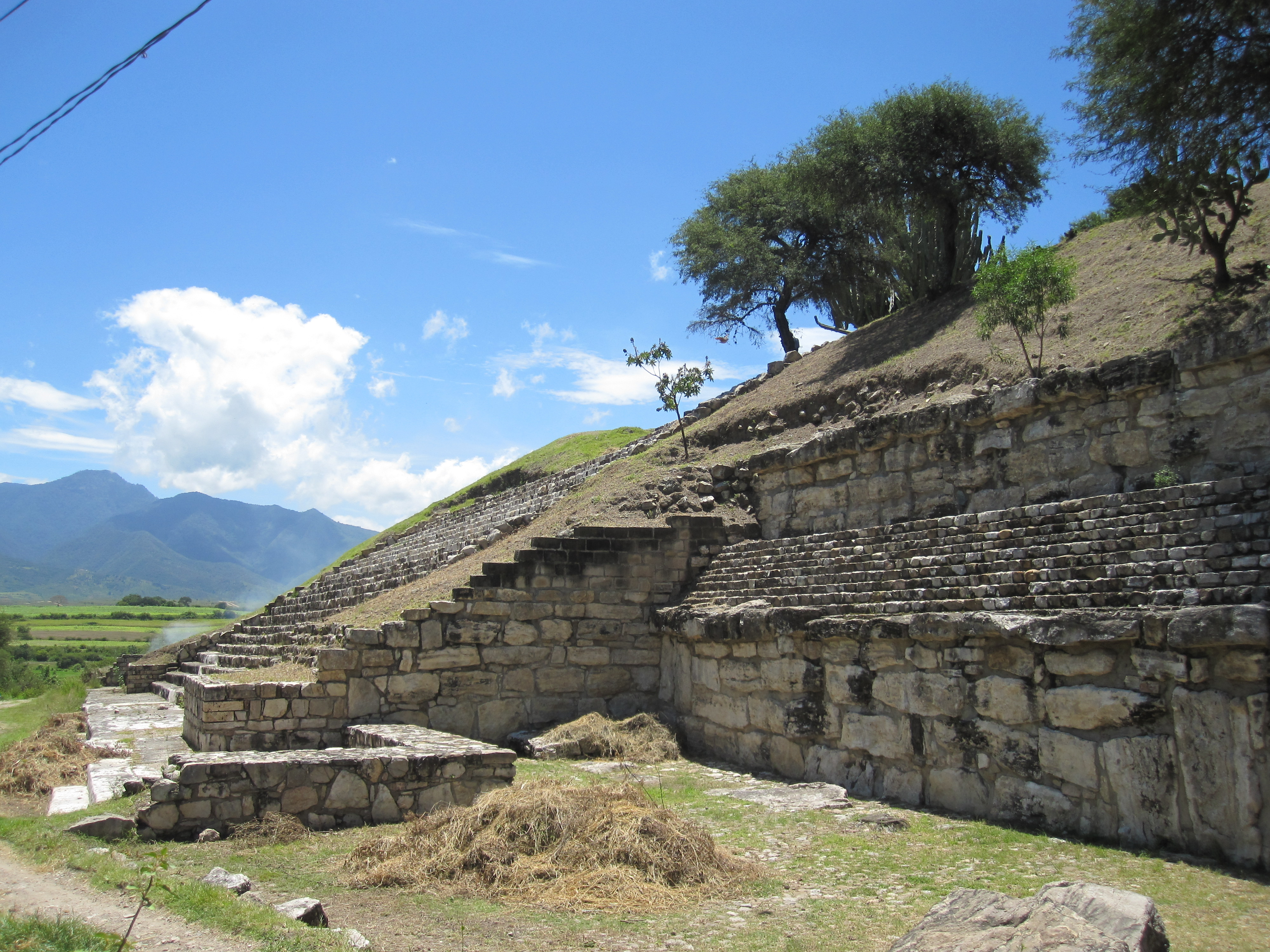
- The partly excavated main pyramid of San Jose Mogote

- Location within Oaxaca
- 17°10′02″N 96°48′12″W
- Cultures: Zapotec
- Location: Guadalupe Etla, Oaxaca, Mexico
- Region: Valley of Oaxaca
- Nearest city: Oaxaca City

History
- Founded: c. 1500 BC
- Original use: Settlement and ceremonial center

Site notes
- Excavation dates: 1966–1980
- Governing body: INAH

San Jose Mogote and other important Formative Period settlements.

San José Mogote is a pre-Columbian archaeological site of the Zapotec, a Mesoamerican culture that flourished in the region of what is now the Mexican state of Oaxaca. A forerunner to the better-known Zapotec site of Monte Albán, San José Mogote was the largest and most important settlement in the Valley of Oaxaca during the Early and Middle Formative periods (ca. 1500-500 BCE) of Mesoamerican cultural development.

Situated in the fertile bottomlands of the Etla arm of the Valley of Oaxaca, the site is surrounded by the present-day village of San José Mogote, about 7.5 miles (12.1 kilometers) northwest of the city of Oaxaca (Evans 2004:122).

San José Mogote is considered to be the oldest permanent agricultural village in the Oaxaca Valley and probably the first settlement in the area to use pottery. It has also "...produced Mexico's oldest known defensive palisades and ceremonial buildings (1300 B.C.), early use of adobe (850 B.C.), the first evidence of Zapotec hieroglyphic writing (600 B.C.), and early examples of architectural terracing, craft specialization, and irrigation (1150-850 B.C.)."

Archaeological investigations conducted during the late 20th century over two decades (e.g., by Kent Flannery and Joyce Marcus) have built an emerging picture of San José Mogote as an early center of Zapotec culture; it was later supplanted or overtaken by Monte Albán. From its beginnings as a cluster of family dwellings, San José Mogote developed to incorporate monumental public structures indicative of a larger and complex political center; it ruled over a number of subsidiary settlements in the Valley of Oaxaca, receiving tribute and services from the region. For as-yet unclear reasons, its status diminished and it became a tributary to the new Zapotec political center and capital, Monte Albán.

== Regional layout ==
San Pablo Huitzo, Santa Marta Etla, Hacienda Blanca, Tomaltepec, Zaachila, Abasolo, Mitla, Tilcajete, Zegache, and Santa Ana Tlapacoyan were just a few of the small settlements that supported San José Mogote, which was located in the most developed, north central area of the Valley of Oaxaca.

== Development of civilization in the Oaxaca Valley ==
Between 1500 and 1150 BCE San José Mogote grew from a few house structures to a village occupying a land area of about 2000 m^{2} (five acres), the largest of some 25 villages in the Valley of the Oaxaca and the only community in the area with public buildings (Price and Feinman 2005:320-321). The introduction of two methods of irrigation may have been responsible for improving agricultural productivity. These included running irrigation ditches from streams and "pot irrigation", which consisted of dipping water out of a number of shallow wells to pour onto the crops (Evans 2004, p. 145).

Settlement at the site consists of a number of distinct households that form the basic social units at San José Mogote. A typical household unit at San José Mogote contained braziers, earth ovens and/or hearths for cooking, stone manos and metates for grinding, and blackened pottery. Food, including maize, was stored in pits that were bell-shaped and located outside the house walls. Later, trash was dumped into these pits, forming midden deposits. Burials and other activity areas were also located in areas adjacent to the house structures. Evidence of ritual includes human and animal figurines associated with burials. Basic indicators of long-distance trade include obsidian chipped stone artifacts. Obsidian is a material not locally available in the Valley of Oaxaca.

After 1150 BCE other settlements in the area remained small, but the village of San José Mogote increased in population and in the elaboration of its public structures, an indication of its role as the controlling capital over the other villages. Between 900 and 600 BCE, the population in the valley increased threefold to 2000 people living in 40 communities, with half of that number residing in San José Mogote, which grew to 50 acres (200,000 m^{2}) in size (Evans 2004, p. 145). A community building, which has been called a "men's home", is believed to have served as a place where the men of the village could gather for civic and ceremonial purposes. The building's ceremonial importance is signified by its orientation of eight degrees west of north. La Venta, an important Olmec site, has the same orientation, which indicates an understanding of astronomy and a calendar system (Evans 2004, pp. 122–123). Exclusively at San José Mogote mirrors of polished magnetite were made and traded to the Olmec Gulf Coast, some 250 miles (400 km) distant. Trade with other areas is also suggested by the greater quantities of obsidian and ceremonial objects, such as drums made from turtle shells, conch-shell trumpets, and stingray spines, as well as pottery designs associated with the Olmec groups, especially at the site of San José de Mogote (Price and Feinman 2005, p. 321).

By 700 BC the population of San José Mogote continued to increase. Between 700 and 500 BC, 3500 people occupied the Valley of Oaxaca, with about 1000 living at San José Mogote, which covered approximately 60 hectares (150 acres) (Evans 2004, p. 187). Major public buildings constructed with adobe bricks and large blocks of stone were built on top of dirt mounds. The largest complex of the area prior to 500 BCE was Mound 1 at San José Mogote, which was constructed atop a hill that was augmented to a height of 15 m (49 ft).

== Political organization ==
In this relatively short period of time the region's emergent Zapotec civilization experienced a shift in social ranking – the transformation from an autonomous, egalitarian tribal community, to that of a socially stratified society – a "defining moment" in history that would be mirrored throughout the Mesoamerican world at sites like Paso de la Amada and San Lorenzo Tenochtitlán, among many others.

According to John E. Clark, "by the end of the San Jose Phase, San Jose Mogote was clearly...a chiefdom". It is not known precisely when or how hereditary inequalities emerged at San Jose Mogote (or anywhere else in Mesoamerica, for that matter) but there are some excellent indicators that give clues as to how this transformation took place and how it was exploited at San Jose Mogote.

One widely accepted theory about the transformation of autonomous communities to chiefdoms is that an individual, or group of individuals must have used some degree of coercion to begin controlling others in their community. Stronger factions may have used coercion to force weaker factions to submit to their desires, and in order to do this they may have obtained their strength through a number of different ways. First, canny choices of farming plots allowed an individual or group of individuals to systematically gain an upper hand in crop production. Second, good alliance-building tactics may have been performed to stave off attacks by competing factions. And, lastly, healthy offspring would have ensured that an individual's lineage was secure for long after they were gone, allowing strong hereditary associations to control the fate of the dynasty.

The theory of reciprocity may have been utilized by one member of the community to gain control over others. For instance, if an individual farmer might have had an overly abundant crop one season, that farmer might have been able to use the excess food to hold a community feast, in which he may have been able to persuade others subconsciously, using the theory of reciprocity, to obtain from them labor or goods that the farmer than may have been able to use to slowly gain an economic advantage over his peers.

It is also thought that a member of one of these early Mesoamerican communities may have also claimed to possess spiritual and/or supernatural powers. This would enable an individual to gain a foothold up in social ranking, as that individual alone would become the only link for ordinary members of a society to communicate with the spirit world. Since spirituality played such an important role in ancient Mesoamerica, claims, whether truly valid or not, to possessing supernatural powers would be a crucial determinant of higher social ranking within a society.

Some or all of these factors are believed to have directly contributed to the social stratification at San José Mogote. It is not known exactly when these events may have occurred, although it is believed to be a gradual development instead of an overnight procedure.

Once San José Mogote became a chiefdom, it began to use its authority to gain control over local communities. Supported by smaller villages, like the tiny farming community of Tierras Largas, located about ten miles (16 km) to the southeast, San Jose Mogote became known as a sort of "capital", or central area of trade and command, for dozens of surrounding dwellings.

In order for San José Mogote to attain this regional, economic and political dominance, in all likely events, for San José Mogote itself to become a regional leader, the people of San José Mogote must have first elected an individual powerful enough to influence and persuade people living in local villages to cooperate with them. The scale of buildings and the materials imported to erect them clearly indicate that San José Mogote's leaders were able to control people in the surrounding countryside.

== Structures, size, and population ==
San José Mogote had many small dwellings dotting its 20 hectare (c. 50 acres) landscape that were used to house around 1,000 people, or roughly half the population of the entire Valley of Oaxaca during the San José Phase.

The construction of a special men's meeting hall was found inside the boundaries of San José Mogote and was evidently rebuilt many times over the years.

Structures 1 and 2 at San José Mogote together form a multi-level public-scale building that is identified as a place where an ethnically diverse community may have been able to come together to discuss important issues of the time.

== Innovations and art ==
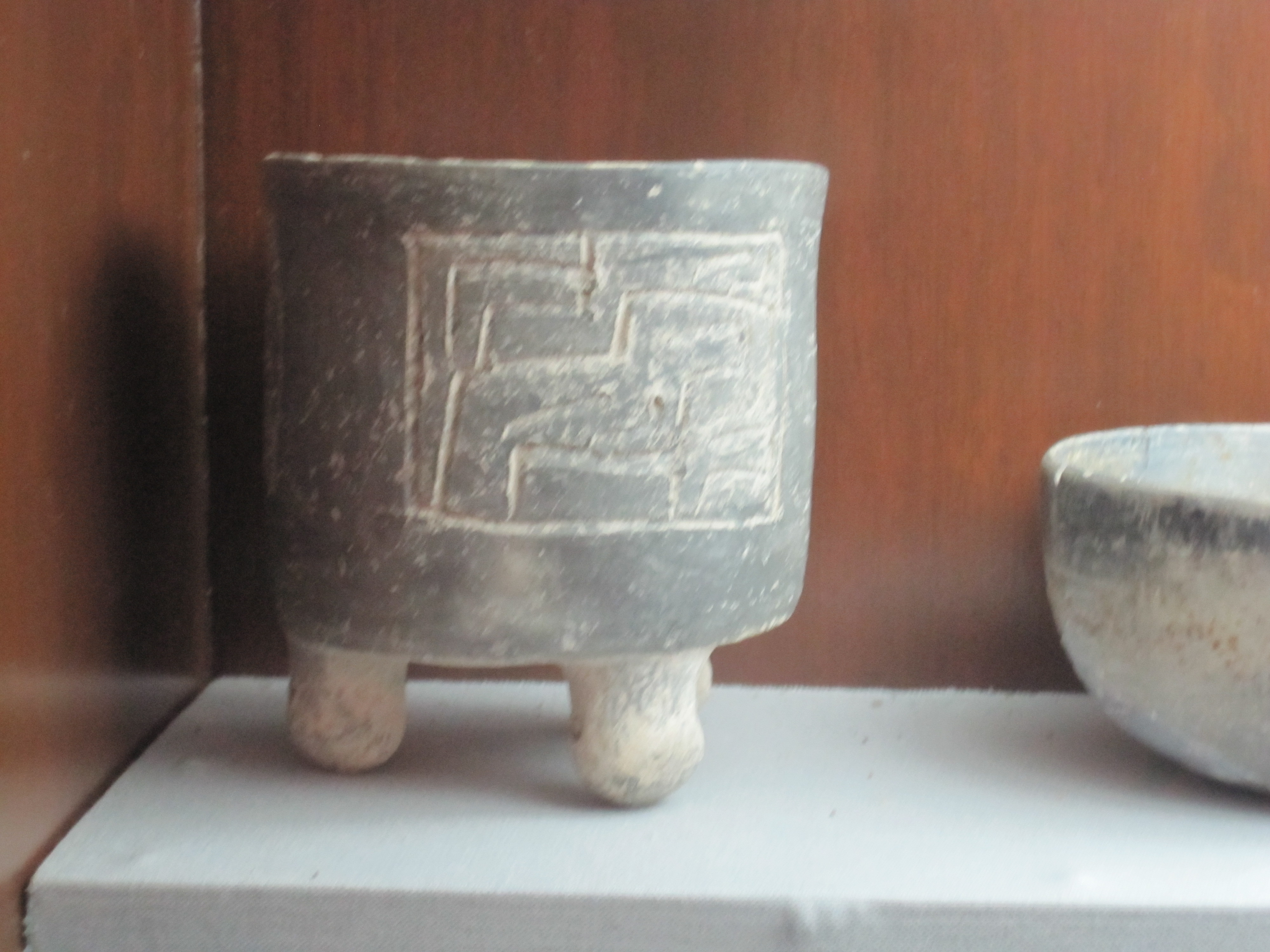
Pottery vessel with Earthquake motif from San José Mogote

Iron ores were a local product of the Valley of Oaxaca. Because San José Mogote was the central area of trade in this region, it utilized its rich resource of iron ore to manufacture polished stone mirrors, many of which have been found as far as the Olmec Gulf Coast Heartland.

Two primary motifs are found on pottery vessels from the Valley of Oaxaca: the forces of earth and sky, symbolically represented by earthquakes or lightning, respectively. Small villages tended to have pottery vessels with lightning, or sky, motifs. Tierras Largas had pottery that favored earthquake, or earth, motifs, and San José Mogote had a mixture of both.

Crop productivity may have seen an increase at San José Mogote due to the initiation of two simple irrigation techniques: pot irrigation and irrigation ditches. Pot irrigation involved digging many shallow wells in order to accumulate water, and then scooping up that water to use on surrounding plants. Irrigation ditches were small-scale systems used to tap into streams in order to allow water to flow over the plants.

=== Monument 3 ===
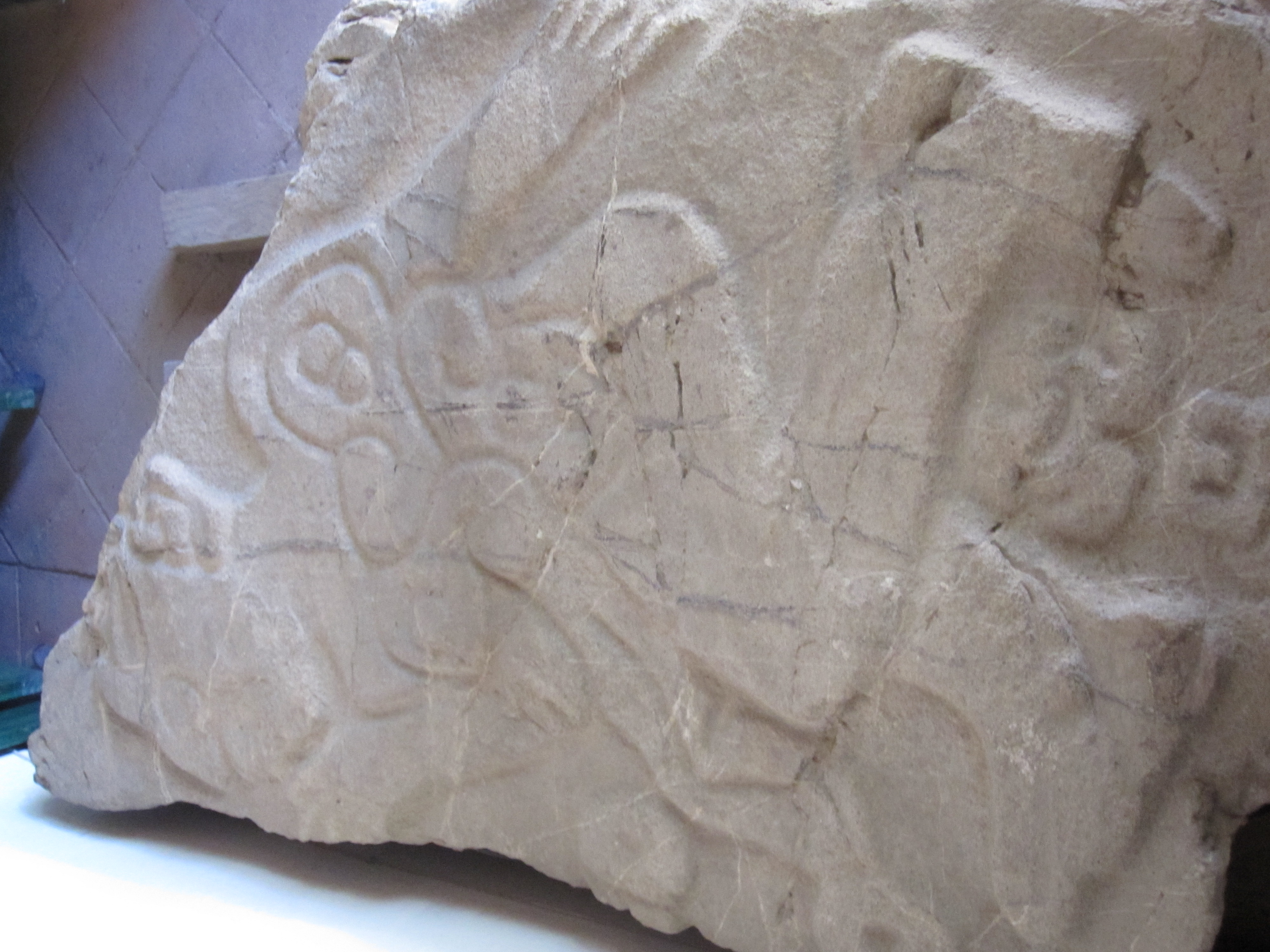
Monument 3 at San José Mogote

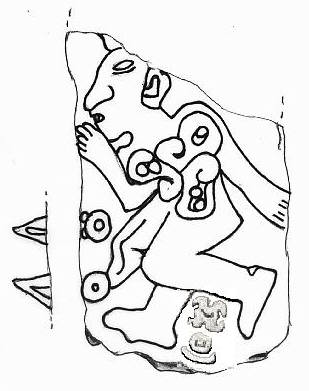
Monument 3 at San Jose Mogote. The two shaded glyphs between his legs are likely his name, Earthquake 1.

A flat, carved stone, designated Monument 3, was placed as a doorstep to the ceremonial structure (Price and Feinman 2005, p. 321). The carving is of a naked man with "a puffy, slitted eye, lips drawn back in a grimace, overall posture of vulnerability ... rounded elements on the chest and abdomen suggesting the guts after disembowelment." Glyphs depict drops of blood and a possible calendar day-name "1 Earthquake." These are the earliest Zapotec glyphs known to exist. While personal bloodletting was suggested by the stingray spines and similar objects made of obsidian or jade, the figure depicted on Monument 3 shows sacrifice of a victim, probably a captive, on a societal level. In a later time period, monuments carved with similar figures, called danzantes (dancers), were present at Monte Albán.

Later the public structures on Mound 1 were rebuilt as a residence for a high-ranking family.

By 500 BCE, with the emergence of Monte Albán as the area's main city, San José Mogote's 1000 years of dominance ended, and it was relegated to the status of a lesser community that fell under Monte Albán's control.

Some of the artifacts from the San José Mogote archaeological site may be viewed in the town of San José Mogote's Community Museum, which is located in the El Cacique Hacienda.
