= Tierras Largas =

Archaeological site in Valley of Oaxaca, Mexico

Tierras Largas is a formative-period archaeological site located in the Etla arm in the Valley of Oaxaca in Mexico. It is considered to be one of the first villages where sedentism originated in the Oaxaca area. The name is Spanish for “Long Lands”.

== Overview ==
Tierras Largas is categorized as a smaller, hamlet village in its region. Located on fertile soils, it was a farming village that contributed resources to the larger governing chiefdom of San José Mogote, 10 kilometers north of Tierras Largas. Tierras Largas has seven sub-phases (one of the phases which shares the same name) spread over the Early and Middle Formative periods. There are no signs of population expansion in Tierras Largas. The site is known to excavators for its house clusters, which are common amongst smaller villages in the Oaxaca Valley.

== Village ==
Tierras Largas was not a largely populated village in mesoamerica. Throughout its seven phase lifespan, the village housed a small farming community that would provide agriculture including maize, avocados, beans, and squash for the larger nearby village of San José Mogote. This small farming community neither grew nor shrunk drastically in size, and throughout each of its phases, the village had a consistent number of houses.

== Art ==
Many forms of art have been recovered from Tierras Largas, “people used imported shell to make beads, and pendants”. Most small villages had pottery vessels that had either earthquake or lightning motifs on them. Almost all pottery vessels with motifs recovered from Tierras Largas favoured earthquakes and had them and earth related motifs on them.

== Artifacts found at the site ==
- Avocado pits and presence of beans
- Deer bones
- Finished mirrors

In feature 57a:

- Complete mano and metate
- Large complete jar
- Broken figurine
- Piece of carbonized wood for matting
- Portion of a second jar

In House 1:

- Chert cores
- Scrapers
- Retouch flakes
- Sherd discs

Out of all the stone found at Tierras Largas, 20% was obsidian.

== Tierras Largas Phase ==
The Tierras Largas Phase is from 1500BC-1150BC. During this time, there were numerous sedentary farming villages located throughout the Valley of Oaxaca. At this time, most settlements were located on low, well-drained piedmont ridges or spurs adjacent to both the fertile zone of high alluvial soils and the major river channels. Tierras Largas phase settlements can be found throughout all three arms of the Valley of Oaxaca, but it is most prominent in the northern arm, the Etla arm. The largest community recognized in the Etla arm is San José Mogote. It is during this phase that we see buildings which are nonresidential, public constructions. “Based on the analyses of the Tierras Largas phase burials, houses, and storage pits, there is no indication that either ranking or socially determined inequality or stratification existed at this time”.

== Bibliography ==
- Beckmann, Jenifer, Charles S. Spencer, Redmond, Elsa M. “Division of Anthropology: Early State Development at San Martín Tilcajete”, American Museum & Natural History, 2011
- Blanton, Richard E., Stephen A. Kowalewski, Feinman, Gary M. (1993). Ancient Mesoamerica: A Comparison of Change in Three Regions: New Studies in Archaeology. United Kingdom: Cambridge :University Press.
- Earle, Timothy K. (1993). Chiefdoms: Power, Economy, and Ideology. England: Cambridge University Press.
- Flannery, Kent V. and Jeremy A. Sabloff (2009). The Early Mesoamerican village. California: Left Coast Press.
- Joyce, Arthur A. (2010). Mixtecs, Zapotecs, and Chatinos: ancient people of southern Mexico. John Wiley and Sons.
- Toby Evans, Susan. (2008). Ancient Mexico & Central America: Archaeology and Culture History. London: Thames and Hudson.
