= CV Villas =

UK-based travel agency for villas

- Type: Private
- Industry: Travel
- Founded: 1972; 54 years ago
- Founders: Richard Cookson; Patricia Cookson
- Headquarters: London, United Kingdom
- Area served: Greece, Italy, Spain, France, Portugal, Turkey, Croatia, Morocco, Florida, Sri Lanka, and the Caribbean
- Products: Specialized villa collections High-end staffed properties (ABOVE); Full-service travel packages
- Parent: DER Touristik UK
- Website: cvvillas.com

CV Villas is a London-based travel agency for villas in Greece, Italy, France, Spain, Portugal, Croatia, Turkey, Morocco, Montenegro, Sri Lanka and the Caribbean. It has over 800 lodgings in the world.

== History ==
CV Villas was founded in 1972 by Patricia and Richard Cookson. In the early days, individually produced, hand-finished brochures were sent out with a note asking for them to be returned. During its first decade, the company added to its collection of Corfiot houses. In the 1980s, the company expanded its portfolio to offer villas on other Greek islands as well as in Italy, France, Spain, Portugal and the Balearics.

By the 1990s, Morocco was added as a new destination. The Cooksons sold their interest in the company in 2004 to travel entrepreneur John Boyle and in 2007. CV Travel was acquired by specialist tour operator Kuoni Travel. Debbie Marshall was appointed managing director in 2004 and, under her management, CV Travel acquired the ski chalet operator, Ski Verbier, in 2005. Richard Cookson continued to work for CV in Corfu for a number of years. In 2007, the company added the Caribbean as a destination, and in 2009, included properties in Great Britain.

In September 2015 DER Touristik Group acquired Kuoni Travel's tour-operator and sales activities including CV Villas.

In 2016 Croatia was added to the portfolio and in 2017 they launched Resort properties. In 2019 the company's new luxury collection ABOVE emerged, containing a selection of fully staffed properties.

Sri Lanka is the most recent destination to be added to their long haul portfolio, launched for travel in 2021.

== Awards ==
CV Travel won Condé Nast Traveler awards in 2007 and 2009 and was a runner-up in 2008, 2016, 2017, 2018, 2019 and 2020.

== Kuoni UK ==
CV Villas is part of The Kuoni UK group. Kuoni is part of DER Touristik (part of the German REWE Group) and is based in Dorking, Surrey, England. The Kuoni UK group also includes:

- Voyages Jules Verne (now trading as Jules Verne)
- Kirker Holidays
- Carrier
- Journey Latin America
- Kuoni Retail
