= Juan Díaz (conquistador) =

Juan Díaz (1480–1549), born in Seville, Spain, was a 16th-century conquistador and the chaplain of the 1518 Grijalva expedition, the Itinerario (itinerary route) of which he wrote. Díaz's Itinerario is regarded as one of the earliest first-hand accounts of the Grijalva expedition and provides valuable contemporary information about the Gulf Coast of Mexico immediately before the arrival of Hernán Cortés. It is considered an important primary source for the early Spanish exploration of Mesoamerica.

He was one of the first Spaniards who explored the named Isla de Sacrificios near Veracruz in Mexico, where the expedition found evidence of human sacrifice.

== See also ==
- Human sacrifice in Aztec culture
