= 1st federal electoral district of Quintana Roo =

Federal electoral district of Mexico

Quintana Roo's 1st
- Electoral district of the Chamber of Deputies of Mexico

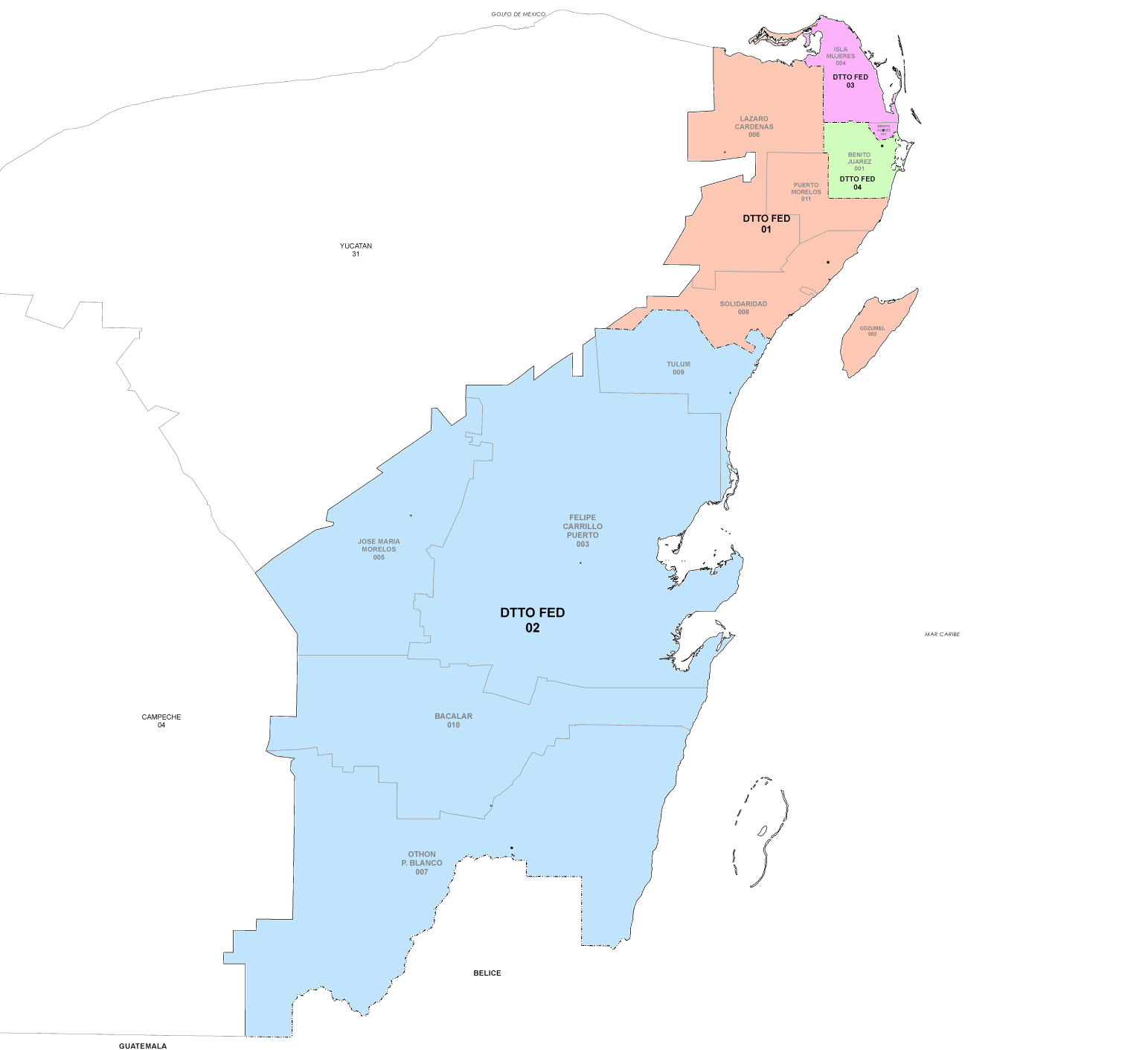
- 1st district since 2023

Incumbent
- Member: Juan Luis Carrillo
- Party: ▌Ecologist Green Party
- Congress: 66th (2024–2027)

District
- State: Quintana Roo
- Head town: Playa del Carmen
- Coordinates: 20°38′N 87°04′W
- Covers: Cozumel, Lázaro Cárdenas, Puerto Morelos, Solidaridad
- PR region: Third
- Precincts: 229
- Population: 478,518 (2020 census)

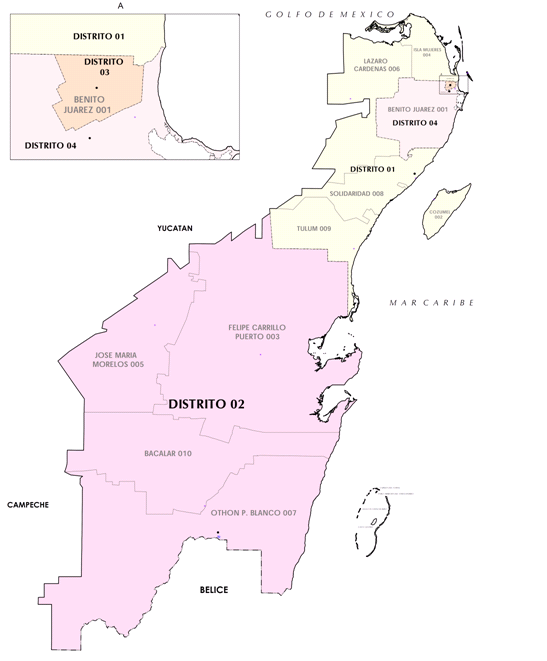
Quintana Roo under the 2017–2022 plan

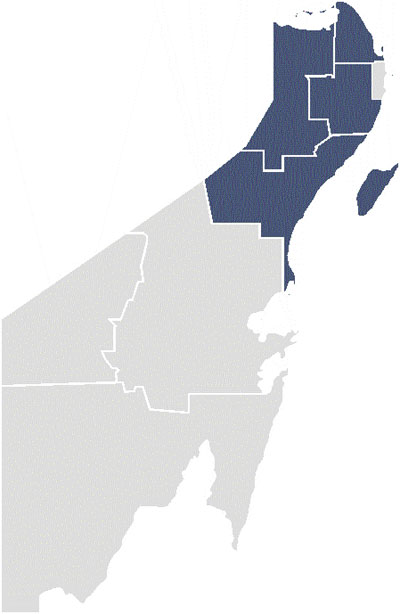
1st district between 2005 and 2017

The 1st federal electoral district of Quintana Roo (Spanish: Distrito electoral federal 01 de Quintana Roo) is one of the 300 electoral districts into which Mexico is divided for elections to the federal Chamber of Deputies and one of four such districts in the state of Quintana Roo.

It elects one deputy to the lower house of Congress for each three-year legislative session by means of the first-past-the-post system. Votes cast in the district also count towards the calculation of proportional representation ("plurinominal") deputies elected from the third region.

The current member for the district, re-elected in the 2024 general election, is Juan Luis Carrillo Soberanis of the Ecologist Green Party of Mexico (PVEM).

== District territory ==
Under the 2023 districting plan adopted by the National Electoral Institute (INE), which is to be used for the 2024, 2027 and 2030 federal elections, the 1st district covers 229 precincts (secciones electorales) across four of the state's 11 municipalities:

- Cozumel, Lázaro Cárdenas, Puerto Morelos and Solidaridad.

The head town (cabecera distrital), where results from individual polling stations are gathered together and tallied, is the city of Playa del Carmen, the municipal seat of Solidaridad. The district reported a population of 478,518 in the 2020 census.

== Previous districting schemes ==
Evolution of electoral district numbers
| | 1973 | 1974 | 1978 | 1996 | 2005 | 2017 | 2023 |
|---|---|---|---|---|---|---|---|
| Quintana Roo | 1 | 2 | 2 | 2 | 3 | 4 | 4 |
| Chamber of Deputies | 194 | 196 | 300 | | | | |

2017–2022

The 2017 redistricting process assigned Quintana Roo its 4th district. From 2017 to 2022, the 1st district comprised the municipalities of Cozumel, Lázaro Cárdenas, Solidaridad, Isla Mujeres and Tulum.

2005–2017

The 2005 districting scheme created the state's 3rd district. Between 2005 and 2017 the 1st district covered the municipalities of Cozumel, Isla Mujeres, Lázaro Cárdenas, Solidaridad, Tulum, and the non-urban area of the municipality of Benito Juárez (i.e., excluding the city and resort of Cancún). Its head town was the city of Playa del Carmen.

1996–2005

Between 1996 and 2005, the 1st district's territory was the same under the 2005 plan, except that it included the entirety of Benito Juárez, including the city and resort of Cancún. Cancún also served as the district's head town for vote-collecting purposes.

1978–1996

The districting scheme in force from 1978 to 1996 was the result of the 1977 electoral reforms, which increased the number of single-member seats in the Chamber of Deputies from 196 to 300; Quintana Roo's allocation, however, remained at two. The 1st district comprised two of the state's (at the time) seven municipalities: José María Morelos and Othón P. Blanco, with the latter serving as its head town.

Prior to 1978

Quintana Roo was admitted to the union on 8 October 1974. Prior to that, as a federal territory, it was assigned only one seat in the Chamber of Deputies: for the first district. The 2nd district was created upon statehood in 1974, halving the territory of the 1st district.

== Deputies returned to Congress ==
(Mexico) National parties
- Current
- PAN
- PRI
- PT
- PVEM
- MC
- Morena
- PAZ
- Somos
- Defunct or local only
- PLM
- PNR
- PRM
- PNM
- PP
- PPS
- PARM
- PFCRN
- CON
- PANAL
- PSD
- PES
- PES
- PRD

Quintana Roo's 1st district
| Election | Deputy | Party | Term | Legislature |
|---|---|---|---|---|
| 1940 | Raymundo Sánchez Azueta | Institutional Revolutionary Party | 1940–1943 | 38th Congress |
| 1943 | Arturo González Villareal | Institutional Revolutionary Party | 1943–1946 | 39th Congress |
| 1946 | Manuel Pérez Ávila | Institutional Revolutionary Party | 1946–1949 | 40th Congress |
| 1949 | Abel Pavía González | Institutional Revolutionary Party | 1949–1952 | 41st Congress |
| 1952 | Antonio Erales Abdelnur | Institutional Revolutionary Party | 1952–1955 | 42nd Congress |
| 1955 | Gastón Pérez Rosado | Institutional Revolutionary Party | 1955–1958 | 43rd Congress |
| 1958 | Félix Morel Peyrefitte | Institutional Revolutionary Party | 1958–1961 | 44th Congress |
| 1961 | Delio Paz Ángeles | Institutional Revolutionary Party | 1961–1964 | 45th Congress |
| 1964 | Luz María Zaleta de Elsner | Institutional Revolutionary Party | 1964–1967 | 46th Congress |
| 1967 | Eliezer Castro Souza | Institutional Revolutionary Party | 1967–1970 | 47th Congress |
| 1970 | Hernán Pastrana Pastrana | Institutional Revolutionary Party | 1970–1973 | 48th Congress |
| 1973 | Jesús Martínez Ross (Note: Martínez Ross resigned his seat in Congress to contend (successfully) for governorship of Quintana Roo.); Sebastián Uc Yam | Institutional Revolutionary Party | 1973–1976 | 49th Congress |
| 1976 | Carlos Gómez Barrera | Institutional Revolutionary Party | 1976–1979 | 50th Congress |
| 1979 | Pedro Joaquín Coldwell (Note: Joaquín Coldwell resigned his seat in Congress to contend (successfully) for the governorship of Quintana Roo.); Salvador Ramos Bustamante | Institutional Revolutionary Party | 1979–1980; 1980–1982 | 51st Congress |
| 1982 | Sara Muza Simón | Institutional Revolutionary Party | 1982–1985 | 52nd Congress |
| 1985 | María Cristina Sangri Aguilar | Institutional Revolutionary Party | 1985–1988 | 53rd Congress |
| 1988 | Elina Coral Castilla | Institutional Revolutionary Party | 1988–1991 | 54th Congress |
| 1991 | Joaquín Hendricks Díaz | Institutional Revolutionary Party | 1991–1994 | 55th Congress |
| 1994 | Sara Muza Simón | Institutional Revolutionary Party | 1994–1997 | 56th Congress |
| 1997 | Addy Joaquín Coldwell | Institutional Revolutionary Party | 1997–2000 | 57th Congress |
| 2000 | Juan Ignacio García Zalvidea (Note: García Zalvidea switched allegiance from the PAN to the PVEM on 18 October 2001. On 15 December 2001, he took leave of his seat in Congress to compete for the municipal presidency of Benito Juárez for the PVEM.); Alicia Ricalde Magaña | National Action Party (Mexico) Ecologist Green Party of Mexico | 2000–2001; 2001–2003 | 58th Congress |
| 2003 | Félix González Canto (Note: González Canto resigned his seat on 5 November 2004); María Concepción Fajardo Muñoz | Institutional Revolutionary Party | 2003–2004; 2004–2006 | 59th Congress |
| 2006 | Sara Latife Ruiz Chávez (Note: In 2007 Ruiz Chávez requested a leave of absence from Congress to compete for the position of General Secretary of the PRI; her bid was unsuccessful and she returned to her seat in the Chamber. She resigned her seat on 28 January 2009.); Juan Carlos González Hernández | Institutional Revolutionary Party | 2006–2009; 2009 | 60th Congress |
| 2009 | Roberto Borge Angulo | Institutional Revolutionary Party | 2009–2012 | 61st Congress |
| 2012 | Román Quian Alcocer | Institutional Revolutionary Party | 2012–2015 | 62nd Congress |
| 2015 | José Luis Toledo Medina | Institutional Revolutionary Party | 2015–2018 | 63rd Congress |
| 2018 | Adriana Teissier Zavala | Social Encounter Party | 2018–2021 | 64th Congress |
| 2021 | Juan Luis Carrillo Soberanis | Ecologist Green Party of Mexico | 2021–2024 | 65th Congress |
| 2024 | Juan Luis Carrillo Soberanis | Ecologist Green Party of Mexico | 2024–2027 | 66th Congress |

== Presidential elections ==
Quintana Roo's 1st district
| Election | District won by | Party or coalition | % |
|---|---|---|---|
| 2018 | Andrés Manuel López Obrador | Juntos Haremos Historia | 67.4140 |
| 2024 | Claudia Sheinbaum Pardo | Sigamos Haciendo Historia | 73.5410 |
