= Addy Joaquín Coldwell =

Mexican politician

Addy Cecilia Joaquín Coldwell (Note: In this Mexican name, the surname is Joaquín and the second or maternal family name is Coldwell.) (born 24 August 1939) is a Mexican politician from Cozumel, Quintana Roo.

Her brother Pedro Joaquín Coldwell was governor of Quintana Roo from 1981 to 1987. During her brother's governorship she served as president of the DIF (Desarrollo Integral de la Familia) in Quintana Roo, then when her husband Edmundo Fernández was the mayor of Benito Juárez, Quintana Roo (the municipality that includes the resort city of Cancún), she served as municipal first lady and president of the DIF.

Joaquín Coldwell is a former member of the Institutional Revolutionary Party (PRI). She served in the Chamber of Deputies (representing Quintana Roo's 1st district from 1997 to 2000) and in the Senate (2000–2006, switching allegiance from the PRI to the PAN in 2005).

In 1998 she tried to obtain her party's candidacy for the governorship of Quintana Roo in the 1999 elections but lost against Joaquín Ernesto Hendricks Díaz. In 2004 after losing again the PRI candidacy for the 2005 elections she broke with the PRI and ran for the governorship as the candidate of the National Action Party (PAN) and Convergence. She lost to the PRI candidate Félix González Canto. In the general election of 2 July 2006, she was elected to the Chamber of Deputies for the PAN, representing the third electoral region via proportional representation.
