= 2022 Quintana Roo gubernatorial election =

Local elections in Quintana Roo

- 5 June 2022
- Turnout: 40.68%

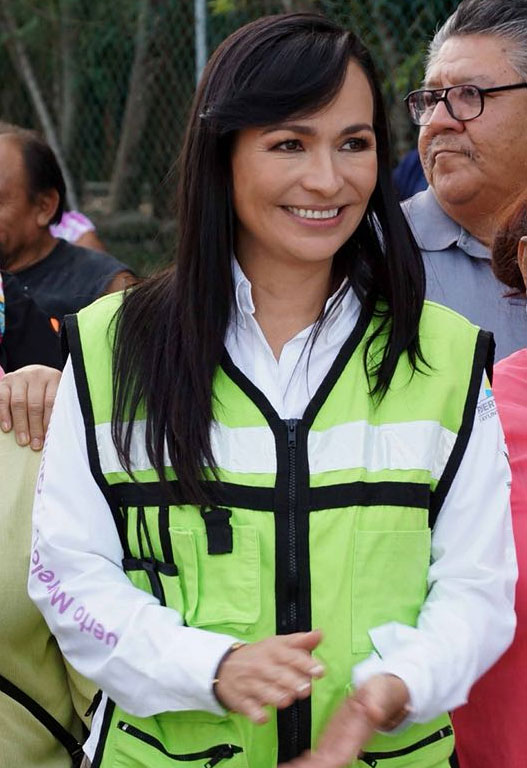

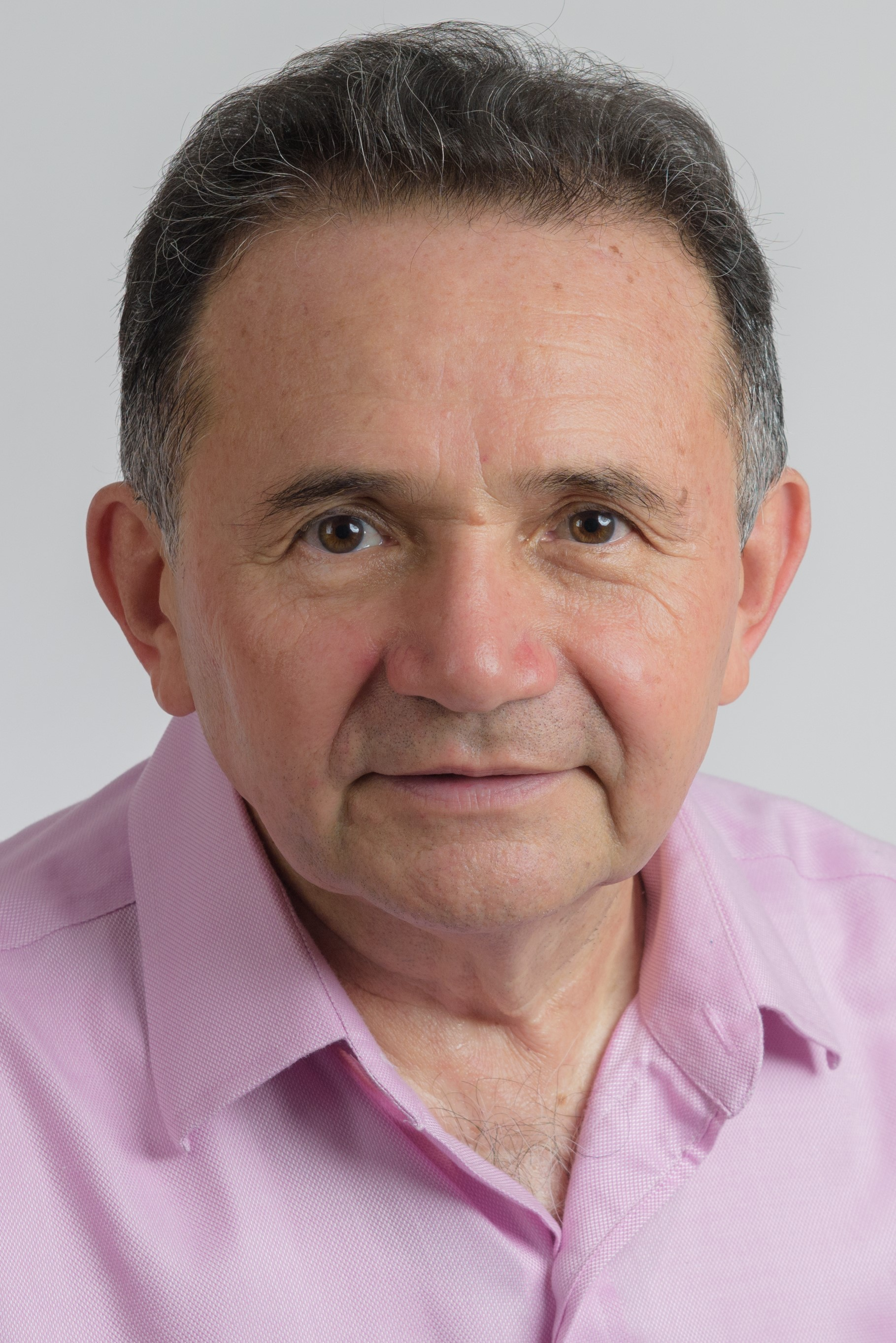

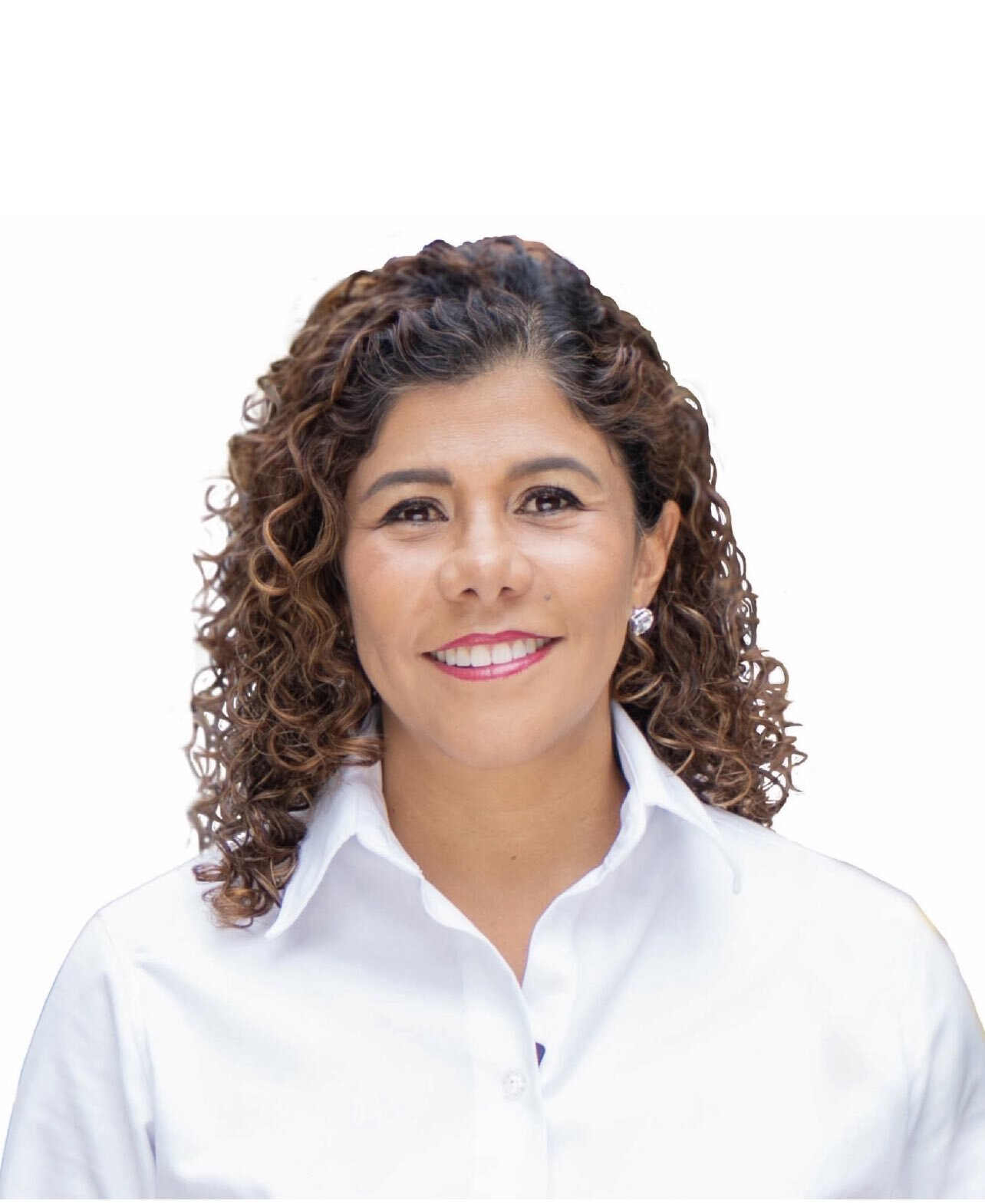
Nominee	Mara Lezama Espinosa	Laura Fernández Piña	José Luis Pech Várguez
Party	MORENA	PRD	MC
Alliance	Juntos Hacemos Historia: National Regeneration Movement; Green Ecologist Party of Mexico; Labor Party; Force for Mexico Quintana Roo	Va por México: Party of the Democratic Revolution; National Action Party; Confianza por Quintana Roo
Popular vote	309,931	87,369	70,315
Percentage	57.06%	16.08%	12.94%
Nominee	Nivardo Mena Villanueva	Leslie Hendricks Rubio
Party	Movimiento Auténtico Social	PRI
Popular vote	38,112	16,048
Percentage	7.02%	2.95%
Governor before election
Carlos Joaquín González
PRD
Elected Governor
Mara Lezama Espinosa
MORENA

The 2022 Quintana Roo gubernatorial election was held on 5 June 2022 to elect a new governor of Quintana Roo and 25 deputies to the state congress. Despite Carlos Joaquín González being a popular incumbent governor from the Party of the Democratic Revolution and the National Action Party the race was considered as a long shot due to the state's high approval of López Obrador, Morena's strong showing in the midterms and Mara Lezama's own popularity. On November 3, 2021, it was revealed Marko Cortés, the leader of the National Action Party expected to lose the state along with other four in play. The election resulted in a landslide for Mexico's ruling Morena party during President López Obrador's first term in office, winning the gubernatorial election. Additionally, they won all 15 local districts with the opposition only getting proportional representation seats.

== Organization ==
=== Political parties ===
In the local elections, 10 political parties have the right to participate. They include seven national parties (PRI, PAN, PRD, PT, PVEM, MC, MORENA) and three local parties (FxM, MAS, CQR).

=== Electoral Process ===
The eight-week gubernatorial campaigning period lasted from 3 April to 1 June, while the six-week state congress campaigning period lasted from 18 April to June 1. The voting took place on 5 June 2022, from 8 a.m. to 6 p.m.

== Alliances and Candidates ==
=== Va por Quintana Roo ===
The National Action Party and the Party of the Democratic Revolution agreed to being in coalition for the gubernatorial election. The Institutional Revolutionary Party decided against forming part of the alliance. On January 7, the coalition registered its integration, conformed by three parties, National Action Party, Party of the Democratic Revolution and Confianza por Quintana Roo.

In January 2022 the coalition agreed that the nominee was selected by the PRD. For the candidate selection the party asked Parametría to do a poll with the three candidates. On 20 January the coalition announced the postulation of the deputy Laura Fernández Piña as the gubernatorial candidate.

==== Nominee ====
- Laura Fernández Piña (PRD), member of the Chamber of Deputies from Quintana Roo 4th District.

==== Lost nomination ====
- Mayuli Martínez Simón (PAN), Senator from Quintana Roo.
- Roberto Palazuelos (PRD), actor, model and producer.

=== Institutional Revolutionary Party ===
The party decided against forming any coalition for the election.

==== Proposed ====
- Leslie Hendricks Rubio (PRI), local deputy and daughter of former governor Joaquín Hendricks Díaz.

=== Citizens' Movement ===
The party decided to go alone in the elections.

On 23 January, the party elected Roberto Palazuelos as their candidate for governor, however, on 18 February, Palazuelos declined his candidacy after it was rumored that Citizens' Movement planned to remove him from the nomination, because of several scandals and conservative positions. On the same day the party offered its candidacy to the incumbent Senator from Quintana Roo, José Luis Pech Várguez.

==== Nominee ====
- José Luis Pech Várguez, Senator from Quintana Roo and 2016 Quintana Roo gubernatorial nominee for Morena. Previously went for the candidacy of Juntos Hacemos Historia.

==== Lost nomination ====
- Marybel Villegas Canché (MC), Senator from Quintana Roo. Previously went for the candidacy of Juntos Hacemos Historia.
- Estefanía Mercado (MC), businesswoman.

==== Declined ====
- Roberto Palazuelos (MC), actor, model and producer. Previously went for the candidacy of Va por México.

=== Juntos Hacemos Historia ===
On 9 November 2021, the parties of Morena, Labor Party and the Ecologist Green Party of Mexico agreed to a coalition in the state elections under the name of Juntos Hacemos Historia. On 7 January 2022, the coalition registered with the addition of the parties Force for Mexico Quintana Roo and Movimiento Auténtico Social. However, on 17 January the party Movimiento Auténtico Social decided to separate from the coalition.

There were 8 candidates interested in the candidacy but only 5 were chosen for a poll in which Mara Lezama was the best positioned for the candidacy.

==== Nominee ====
- Mara Lezama Espinosa (Morena), municipal president of Benito Juarez.

==== Lost nomination ====
- José Luis Pech Várguez (Morena), Senator from Quintana Roo.
- Marybel Villegas Canché (Morena), Senator from Quintana Roo.
- Luis Alegre Salazar, Former deputy.
- Laura Beristain, municipal president of Solidaridad.
- Manuel Aguilar Ortega.
- Raúl Ojeda González, lawyer.
- Alfredo Kanter Culebro (Morena).

=== Movimiento Auténtico Social ===
On 17 January 2022, the party decided to separate from the coalition Juntos Hacemos Historia and instead put their own candidates.

On 3 February 2022, the party choose Nivardo Mena Villanueva, former municipal president of Lázaro Cárdenas, as their nominee, because he was the only person interested in the nomination.

==== Nominee ====
- Josué Nivardo Mena Villanueva, municipal president of Lázaro Cárdenas (2018–2021)

== Polling data ==
=== By political party ===
Polling firm	Date	PAN	PRI	MORENA	Other	No one/ Undecided
TResearch	1 July 2021	17%	16%	44%	18%	6%
Campaigns & Elections	13 July 2021	13%	16%	40%	31%	—
Campaigns & Elections	31 July 2021	19%	14%	45%	22%	—
Campaigns & Elections	31 August 2021	19%	14%	43%	6%	18%
Factometríca	28 October 2021	16.9%	7.2%	49%	13.7%	13.2%
Demoscopia digital	1 November 2021	19.2%	5.3%	44.8%	11.5%	19.2%
Campaigns & Elections	5 November 2021	18%	10%	46%	26%	—
Campaigns & Elections	11 November 2021	17%	7%	47%	29%	—
Campaigns & Elections	16 November 2021	22%	15%	45%	18%	—
Heraldo Media Group	22 November 2021	31.45%	12.49%	36.36%	3.96%	18.74%
Campaigns & Elections	25 November 2021	23%	16%	42%	19%	—
Campaigns & Elections	7 December 2021	20%	13%	46%	21%	—
Heraldo Media Group	13 December 2021	29.8%	8.3%	38.9%	6.8%	16.2%
Demoscopia Digital	23 December 2021	13.8%	7.3%	45.6%	12.5%	20.3%
Campaigns & Elections	5 January 2022	22%	10%	37%	31%	—
FacttoMétrica	7 January 2022	23.8%	8.8%	39%	16.5%	11.9%
Campaigns & Elections	13 January 2022	17%	9%	36%	38%	—
Campaigns & Elections	19 January 2022	17%	8%	35%	40%	—

=== By candidate ===
Polling firm	Date	Fernández	Lezama	Palazuelos	Hendricks	Mena	No one/ Undecided
Massive Caller	24 January 2022	20.3%	32.3%	15.9%	6.1%	—	25.4%
Campaigns & Elections	25 January 2022	18%	38%	16%	11%	—	17%
Demoscopia digital	31 January 2022	21.6%	42.7%	9.4%	4.8%	—	21.5%
Campaigns & Elections	2 February 2022	15%	43%	15%	—	—	27%
Massive Caller	4 February 2022	19.9%	34.3%	14.7%	9%	—	22.1%
El Financiero	8 February 2022	22%	35%	13%	—	—	30%
Campaigns & Elections	9 February 2022	16%	37%	18%	—	—	29%
Factométrica	10 February 2022	18.3%	46.7%	12.4%	9.7%	—	12.9%
El Heraldo de México	14 February 2022	13.2%	28.4%	22.3%	8.3%	—	14%
Demoscopia Digital	16 February 2022	22.1%	43.3%	6.2%	6.7%	—	21.7%
Campaigns & Elections	16 February 2022	9%	45%	18%	4%	—	24%
El Universal	18 February 2022	17%	42%	9%	7%	4%	21%
Palazuelos declines his candidacy and the party selects José Luis Pech.
Polling firm	Date	Fernández	Lezama	Pech	Hendricks	Mena	No one/ Undecided
Campaigns & Elections	23 February 2022	20%	38%	11%	8%	—	23%
Demoscopia digital	25 February 2022	16.5%	39.2%	17.2%	4.5%	—	22.6%
Campaigns & Elections	2 March 2022	24%	32%	18%	7%	—	19%
De las Heras Demotecnia	4 March 2022	15%	58%	14%	8%	5%	5%
Demoscopia digital	7 March 2022	18.2%	42.4%	16.3%	4.6%	—	18.5%
Campaigns & Elections	9 March 2022	23%	38%	10%	6%	—	23%
El Heraldo de México	14 March 2022	23.2%	33.5%	13.7%	10.7%	—	18.9%
Campaigns & Elections	15 March 2022	23%	37%	12%	5%	—	23%
Demoscopia Digital	17 March 2022	20.5%	43.6%	12.8%	5.3%	—	17.8%
Reforma	17 March 2022	25%	49%	7%	19%	0%	—
El Universal	23 March 2022	14.1%	41.5%	11.2%	7.0%	1.2%	26.2%
Campaigns & Elections	23 March 2022	21%	39%	10%	5%	—	25%
Demoscopia Digital	27 March 2022	20.2%	39.8%	13.1%	5.2%	—	21.2%
Campaigns & Elections	30 March 2022	21%	38%	17%	6%	—	18%
De las Heras Demotecnia	30 March 2022	13%	59%	19%	6%	3%	3%
El Universal	4 April 2022	18%	42%	10%	8%	4%	22%
Demoscopia Digital	4 April 2022	18.7%	43.3%	9.6%	5.7%	—	22.7%
Campaigns & Elections	4 April 2022	23%	40%	15%	7%	—	15%
El Financiero	6 April 2022	27%	48%	9%	12%	4%	4%
Demoscopia Digital	11 April 2022	20.3%	44.2%	8.7%	5.1%	—	21.7%
Factométrica	15 April 2022	18.5%	43.5%	14.5%	6.3%	—	17.2%
Demoscopia Digital	18 April 2022	22.9%	46.3%	7.2%	4.7%	—	18.8%
Campaigns & Elections	19 April 2022	24%	42%	16%	4%	—	14%
El Economista	25 April 2022	14.5%	40%	8.1%	8.7%	2.2%	28.7%
Demoscopia Digital	25 April 2022	23.6%	47.2%	9.6%	6.8%	—	12.8%
El Heraldo de México	25 April 2022	21.2%	39.5%	16.2%	6.6%	2.9%	16.5%
El Universal	28 April 2022	16%	47%	14%	5%	4%	18%
Novedades Quintana Roo	1 de mayo de 2022	31.9%	38.1%	14.5%	11.1%	4.4%	—
Demoscopia Digital	2 May 2022	21.1%	48.3%	11.1%	5.6%	—	12.9%

== Results ==
=== Gubernatorial election ===
2022 Quintana Roo gubernatorial election
Party	Candidate	Votes by party		Votes by candidate	
Party	Candidate	#	%	#	%
National Regeneration Movement	Maria Elena Hermelinda Lezama Espinosa	176,935	32.57	309,931	57.06
Green Ecologist Party of Mexico	Maria Elena Hermelinda Lezama Espinosa	109,441	20.15	309,931	57.06
Labor Party	Maria Elena Hermelinda Lezama Espinosa	14,659	2.70	309,931	57.06
Force for Mexico Quintana Roo	Maria Elena Hermelinda Lezama Espinosa	8,896	1.64	309,931	57.06
National Action Party	Laura Lynn Fernandez Piña	65,100	11.98	87,369	16.08
Party of the Democratic Revolution	Laura Lynn Fernandez Piña	16,259	2.99	87,369	16.08
Trust for Quintana Roo	Laura Lynn Fernandez Piña	6,010	1.11	87,369	16.08
Citizens' Movement	José Luis Pech Várguez			70,315	12.94
Authentic Social Movement	Nivardo Mena Villanueva			38,112	7.02
Institutional Revolutionary Party	Leslie Hendricks Rubio			16,048	2.95
Null votes				20,946	3.86
Write-ins				492	0.09
Total				543,213	100.00
Instituto Electoral de Quintana Roo.

== See also ==
- 2022 Mexican Local Elections
