= 2010 Quintana Roo gubernatorial election =

Local election in Mexico

- 4 July 2010
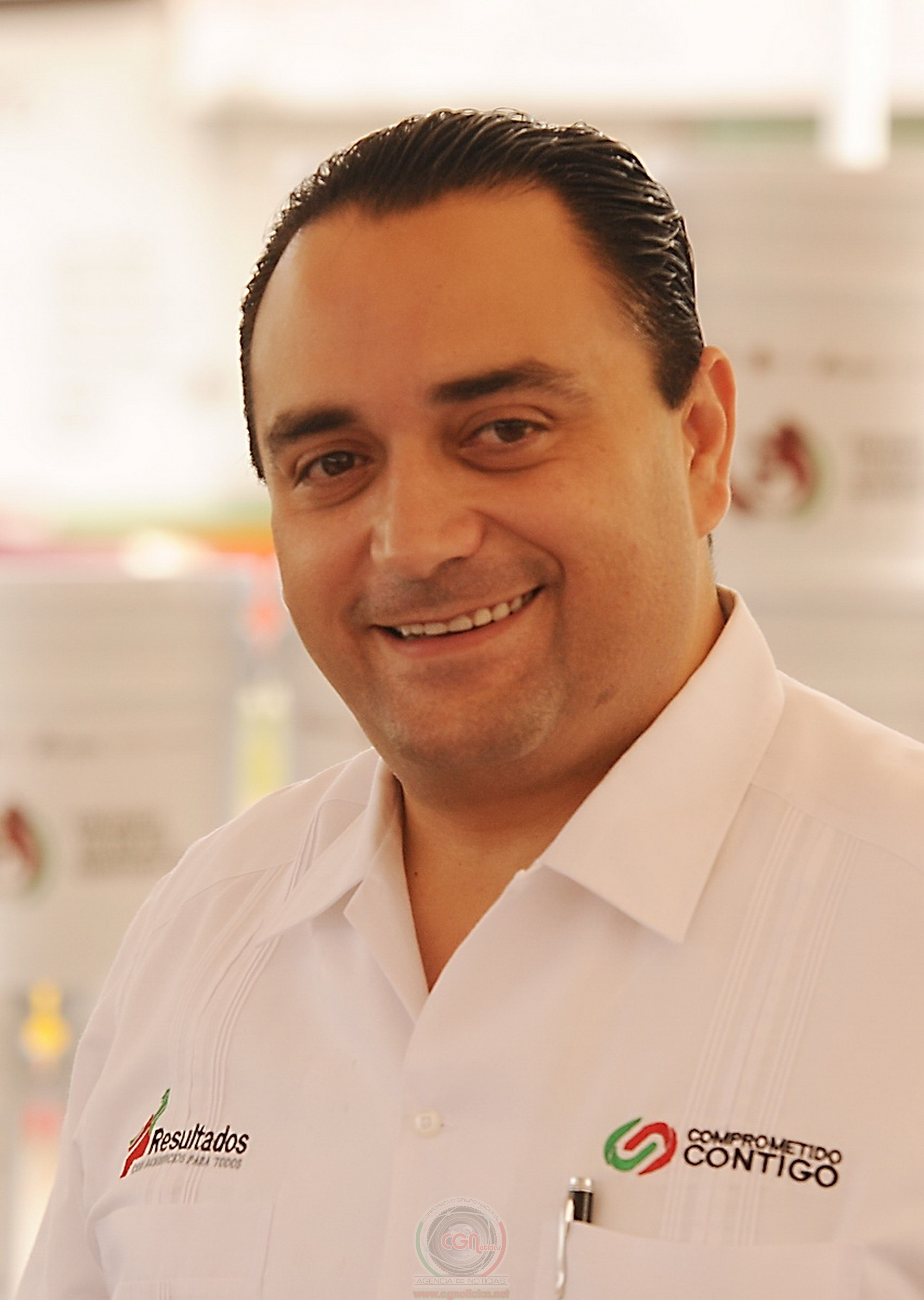

Nominee	Roberto Borge Angulo	Francisco Gerardo Mora Vallejo	Alicia Ricalde Magaña
Party	PRI	PRD	PAN
Alliance	Alianza Quintana Roo Avanza: Institutional Revolutionary Party; Ecologist Green Party of Mexico; New Alliance Party	Mega Alianza Todos por Quintana Roo: Party of the Democratic Revolution; Labor Party; Convergence
Popular vote	197,555	97,929	58,287
Percentage	52.59%	26.07%	15.52%
Governor before election
Félix González Canto
PRI
Elected Governor
Roberto Borge Angulo
PRI

The 2010 Quintana Roo gubernatorial election was held on 4 July 2010, in the Mexican state of Quintana Roo.

== Results ==
2010 Quintana Roo gubernatorial election
Candidate	Alliance	Popular Vote	Percentage
Roberto Borge Angulo	Alianza Quintana Roo Avanza: Institutional Revolutionary Party; Ecologist Green Party of Mexico; New Alliance Party	197,555	52.59%
Francisco Gerardo Mora Vallejo	Mega Alianza Todos por Quintana Roo: Party of the Democratic Revolution; Labor Party; Convergence	97,929	26.07%
Alicia Ricalde Magaña	National Action Party	58,287	15.52%
Null votes		21,865	5.82%
Total		375,636	100.00%
