= Sara Ruiz Chávez =

Mexican politician

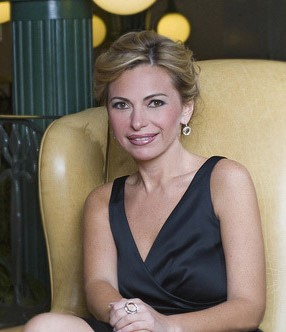
Sara Latife Ruiz Chávez

Sara Latife Ruiz Chávez (born 21 October 1976) is a Mexican politician affiliated with the Institutional Revolutionary Party (PRI). In 2015–2018 she represented Quintana Roo and the third electoral region as a plurinominal deputy during the 63rd Congress.

== Political career ==
Ruiz Chávez was born in Cozumel, Quintana Roo, in 1976. After obtaining a degree in economics from the Universidad Autónoma de Yucatán in 1994, Ruiz Chávez began her political career in her native Cozumel, serving in the public administration of the Municipality of Cozumel. She served as its tourism director and director of sustainable economic development; she went on to serve in the cabinets of Joaquín Hendricks and Félix González Canto, including a stint as the state's secretary of planning and development from 2005 to 2006. In the 2006 general election she won a seat in the Chamber of Deputies for the 60th Congress, representing Quintana Roo's first district. She sat on commissions dealing with tourism, culture, and social development, as well as a special commission for regional projects in southern and southeastern Mexico.

In 2007 she ran for General Secretary of the National Executive Council, the second-highest post in the PRI, but lost out to Beatriz Paredes.

When her first term as a federal deputy ended, she returned to the Quintana Roo state cabinet as the secretary of tourism. She left that post in 2012 to become the technical secretary of the cabinet before being appointed as the education and culture secretary for a brief time in 2013. She also served as an economic advisor to Governor Roberto Borge Angulo and as a delegate of PROFECO in Quintana Roo.

When the 63rd Congress began, only 499 deputies were available to fill the seats. The PRI's defeat in a special election called to elect the representative from the first district of the state of Aguascalientes opened up another proportional representation seat for the PRI to fill; had the PRI won the election, the last third region slot would have been awarded to Movimiento Ciudadano. Latife was sworn in as the 500th deputy on 1 February 2016 and served on the Human Rights, Urban Development and Land Use, and Environment and Natural Resources Commissions.
