= Laura Fernández Piña =

Mexican politician

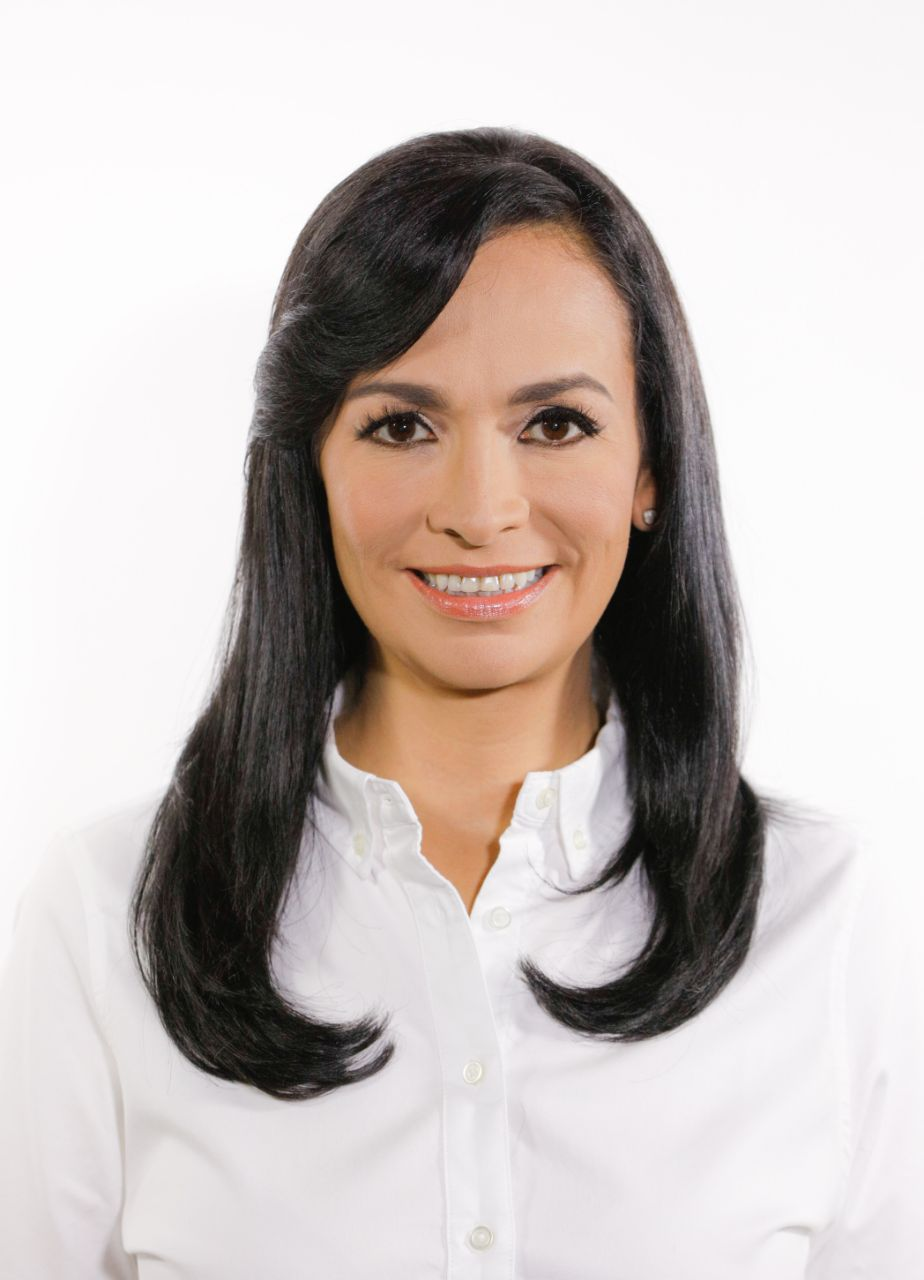
- Fernandez in 2018

Member of the Chamber of Deputies
- In office 2021–2024
- Constituency: Quintana Roo's 4th

Personal details
- Born: Laura Lynn Fernández Piña; 11 June 1971 (age 55) Torreón, Coahuila, Mexico
- Party: Party of the Democratic Revolution
- Education: Universidad del Valle de Atemajac

Laura Lynn Fernández Piña (Note: In this Spanish name, the first or paternal surname is Fernández and the second or maternal family name is Piña.) (born 11 June 1971) is a Mexican marketing professional and politician from the Party of the Democratic Revolution (PRD).

== Early life ==
She was born in the city of Torreón, Coahuila, and grew up in Guadalajara, Jalisco. She is the daughter of Luis Fernández Meza and Marcia Piña Puchi. She earned her degree in marketing from the Universidad del Valle de Atemajac in Guadalajara.

== Political career ==
In 1999, Fernández Piña dabbled in politics behind the Party of the Democratic Revolution and also has occupied several diverse positions in public administration. She headed the Department of Tourism and Public Relations in the city council of Benito Juárez (Cancún) during the 1999-2002 administration. Then, she has the delegate to the Quintana Roo Institute for Women. From 2005 to 2008 she was the technical secretary of the Cabinet of Benito Juárez's city council.

=== Local deputy in Quintana Roo (2008-2011) ===
Fernández Piña was elected to the Congress of Quintana Roo for District X with the Institutional Revolutionary Party (PRI) for the period 2008-2011 and presided over the Finance, Budget, and Public Accounts Committee for the XII Legislature of the State Congress. She was also a candidate for Quintana Roo's 3rd federal electoral district.

=== Secretary of tourism of Quintana Roo (2013-2016) ===
In 2013 she held the role of Secretary of Tourism of the State Government of Quintana Roo (SEDETUR) until 2016 in PRI Governor Roberto Borge Angulo's administration. In 2014, she participated in the organization of the 39th Edition of the Tianguis Turístico de México in Cancún. In April 2016, she resigned from the position and subsequently her affiliation with the PRI in order to join the Ecologist Green Party of Mexico and to be a candidate for municipal president of Puerto Morelos.

=== Municipal president of Puerto Morelos (2016-2021) ===
In the local elections of 2016, Fernández Piña was elected the first female municipal president of Puerto Morelos, having the honor of heading the first city council of the new municipality from 2016 to 2018. During her first administration she presided over the Conferencia Nacional de Municipios de México (CONAMM) (National Conference of Municipalities of Mexico), which assembles more than 2,400 city councils of different party affiliations. Subsequently, she became the first woman to be reelected as municipal president in Quintana Roo after her win in the 2018 elections, resulting in a second term that she held until March 2021.

=== Federal deputy (2021-2024) ===
In 2021, she was elected the Ecologist Green Party's candidate to run for the federal Chamber of Deputies for the coalition "Juntos Hacemos Historia" (Together We Make History) in Quintana Roo's 4th district. She was elected on 5 June with 43.60% of the votes. In March 2022, she requested an indefinite leave of absence as federal deputy to run for governor of Quintana Roo. In the absence of an alternate, her seat in the Chamber of Deputies became vacant until her subsequent reincorporation in June.

=== Candidate for governor of Quintana Roo (2022) ===
In January 2022 she resigned from the Ecologist Green Part of Mexico to be a candidate for governor of Quintana Roo for the Party of the Democratic Revolution. On 21 January 2022, she registered on behalf of the "Va por Quintana Roo" coalition. In the 5 June elections, Fernández Piña came in second place, with 16.08% of the votes, 41 points behind the elected governor Mara Lezama Espinosa of the National Regeneration Movement, who received 57.06% of the votes cast.

== See also ==
- LXV Legislature of the Mexican Congress
