= 2016 Quintana Roo gubernatorial election =

Local election in Mexico

- 5 June 2016
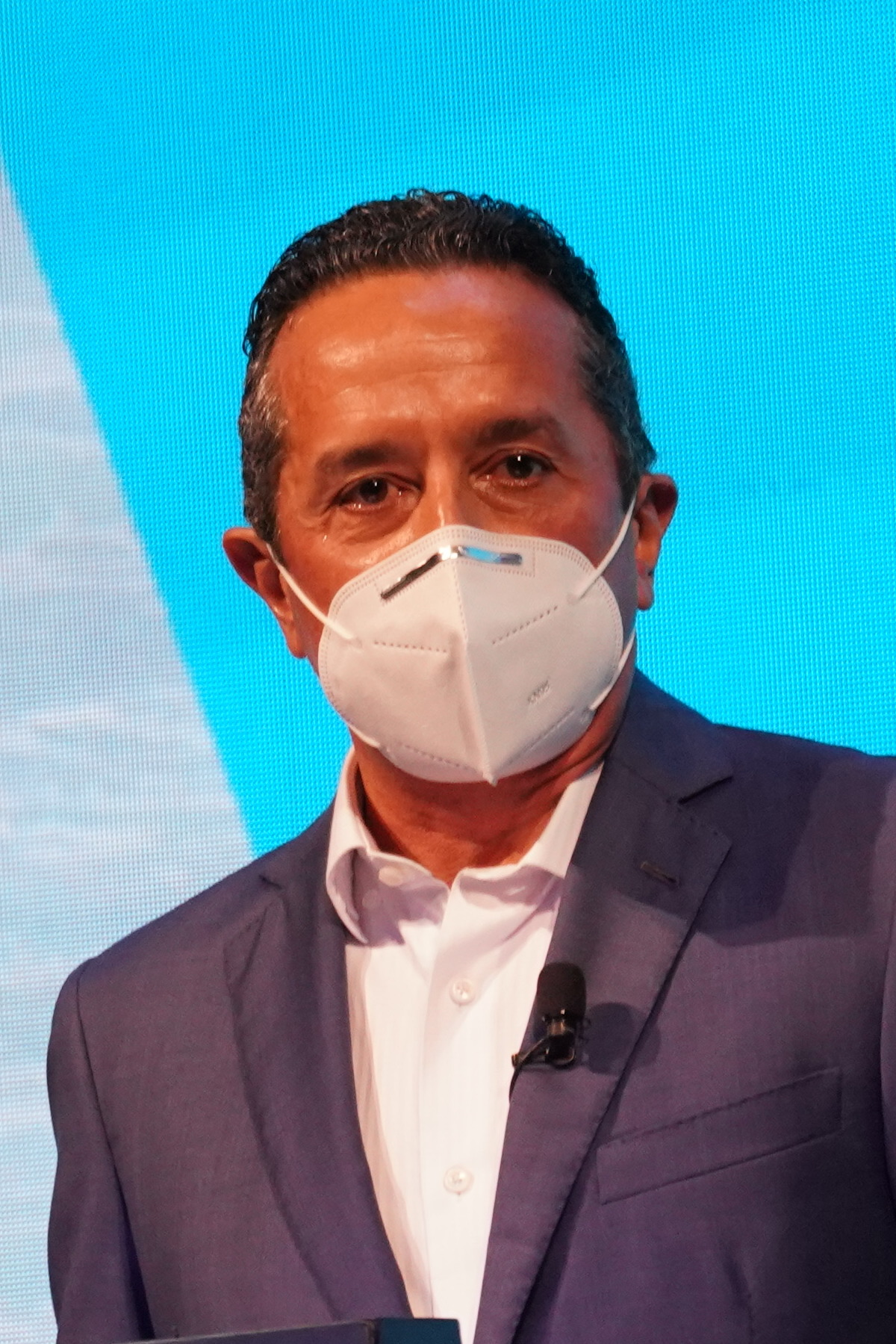

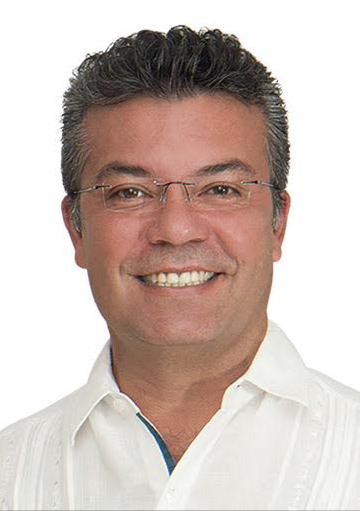

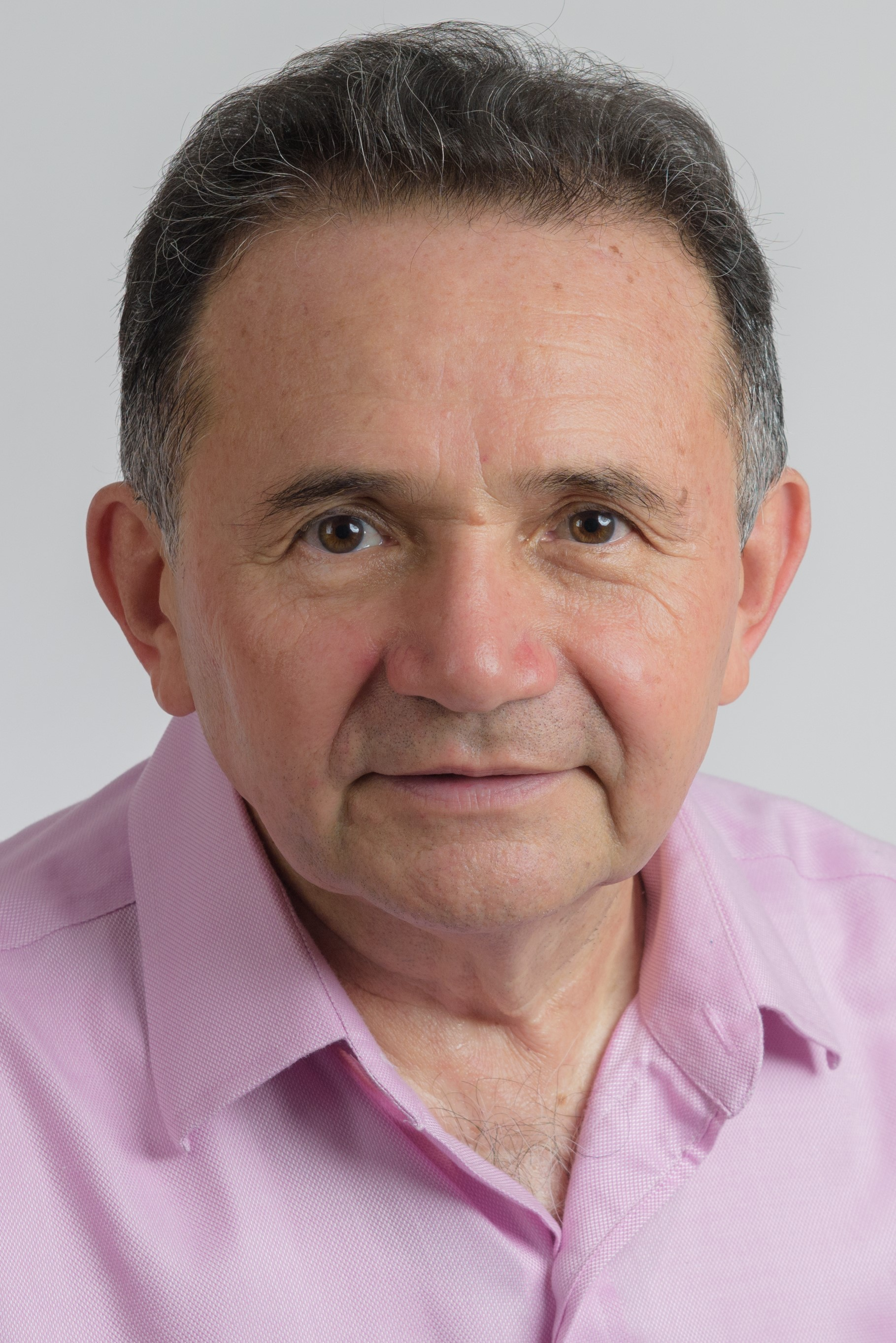
Nominee	Carlos Joaquin Gonzalez	Mauricio Gongora Escalante	José Luis Pech Várguez
Party	PRD	PRI	MORENA
Alliance	Quintana Roo Une: Party of the Democratic Revolution; National Action Party	Todos Somos Quintana Roo: Institutional Revolutionary Party; Ecologist Green Party of Mexico; New Alliance Party
Popular vote	263,193	211,398	65,367
Percentage	45.02%	36.16%	11.18%
Governor before election
Roberto Borge Angulo
PRI
Elected Governor
Carlos Joaquin Gonzalez
PRD

The 2016 Quintana Roo gubernatorial election was held on 5 June 2016. This was the first time in the state's history that the governor elected was not from the Institutional Revolutionary Party.

== Results ==
2016 Quintana Roo gubernatorial election
Candidate	Alliance	Popular Vote	Percentage
Carlos Joaquín González	Quintana Roo Une: Party of the Democratic Revolution; National Action Party	263,193	45.02%
Mauricio Góngora Escalante	Todos Somos Quintana Roo: Institutional Revolutionary Party; Ecologist Green Party of Mexico; New Alliance Party	211,398	36.16%
José Luis Pech Várguez	National Regeneration Movement	65,367	11.18%
Rogelio Márquez Valdivia	Social Encounter Party	19,274	3.30%
Alejandro Alvarado Muro	Labor Party	8,171	1.40%
Write-ins		660	0.11%
Null votes		16,521	2.83%
TOTAL		584,584	100.00%
