= Leona Vicario railway station =

Railway station in Quintana Roo, Mexico

Leona Vicario

General information
- Location: Puerto Morelos, Quintana Roo, Mexico
- Coordinates: 20.98005°N 87.19495°W
- Platforms: 2
- Tracks: 4

Services
Preceding station	Tren Maya	Following station
Nuevo Xcán toward Palenque	Tren Maya	Cancún Airport Terminus

Leona Vicario station (named for Leona Vicario, a figure in the Mexican War of Independence) is a train station in the municipality of Puerto Morelos, Quintana Roo, just outside the town of Leona Vicario. The station connects with and serves local transportation and tourism in the Holbox area.

== Tren Maya ==
Andrés Manuel López Obrador announced the Tren Maya project in his 2018 presidential campaign. On 13 August 2018, he announced the complete outline. The new Tren Maya put Leona Vicario station on the route connecting Valladolid railway station and Cancún Airport railway station.
