= Governor Hendricks =

Governor Hendricks may refer to:

- Joaquín Hendricks Díaz (born 1951), Governor of Quintana Roo from 1999 to 2005
- Thomas A. Hendricks (1819–1885), 6th Governor of Indiana
- William Hendricks (1782–1850), 3rd Governor of Indiana
