= Laura Fernández (disambiguation) =

Laura Fernández (born 1986) is a Costa Rican politician and president of the country since 2026.

Laura Fernández may also refer to:

- Laura Fernandez (musician) (born 1960), Canadian pianist, illustrator and broadcaster
- Laura Fernández Piña (born 1971), Mexican marketing professional and politician
- Laura Fernández Espeso (born 1972), Spanish media executive
- Laura Fernández (figure skater) (born 1988), Spanish figure skater, competed in the 2005 World Figure Skating Championships
- Laurita Fernández (Laura Inés Fernández, born 1990), Argentine TV host
- Laura Fernández, Spanish swimmer, competed in swimming at the 2009 Mediterranean Games

== See also ==
- Lara Fernandez (born 1996), Spanish kickboxer
