= Puerto Morelos =

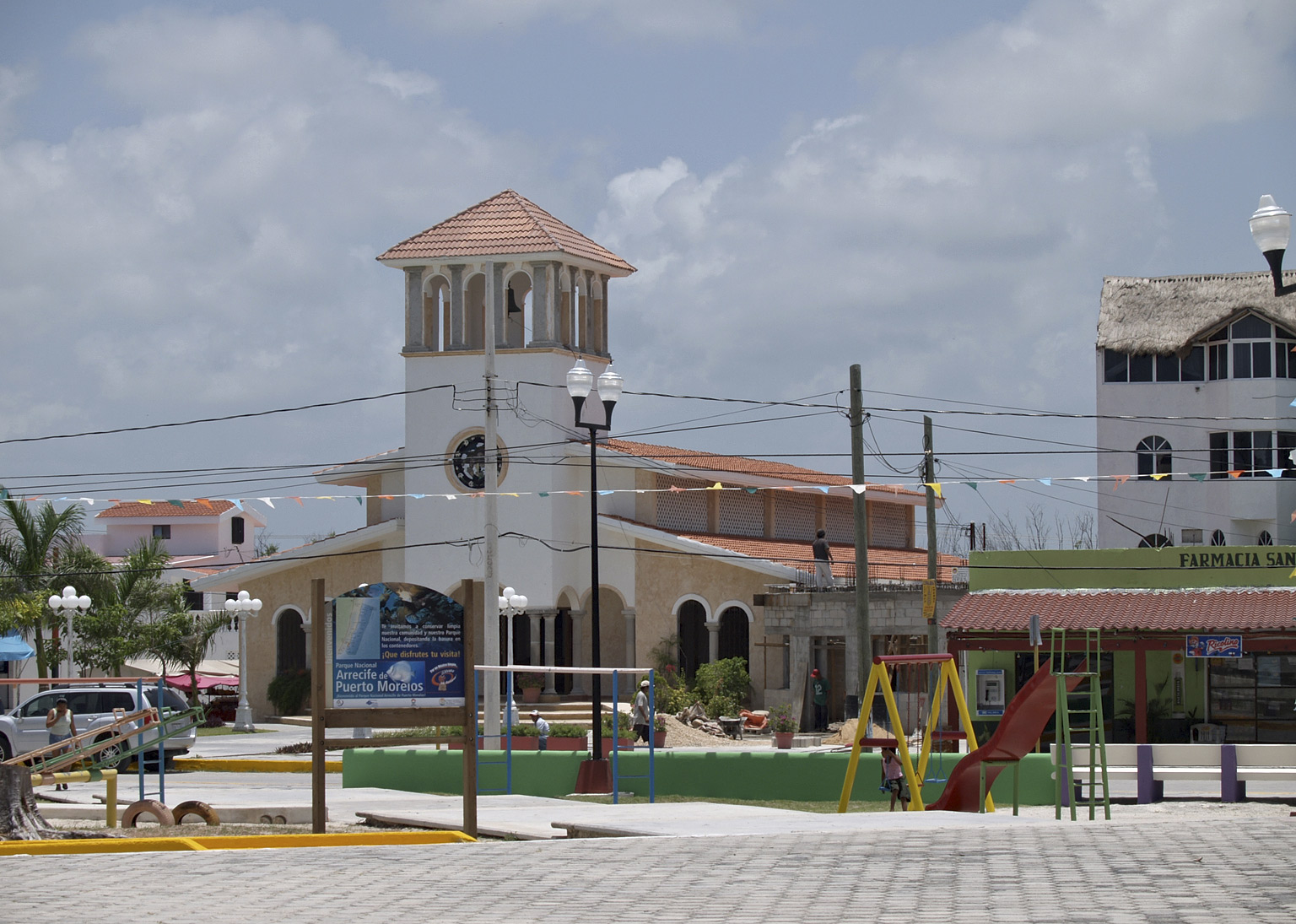
- Puerto Morelos plaza

- Location within Quintana Roo Location within Mexico
- Coordinates: 20°51′13″N 86°52′31″W
- Country: Mexico
- State: Quintana Roo
- Municipality: Puerto Morelos
- Named for: José María Morelos

Government
  - Mayor: Francisco Mendoza Reyna
- Elevation: 4 m (13 ft)

Population (2020)
  - Total: 19,202
- Demonym: Puertomorelense
- Time zone: UTC-5 (Zona Sureste)
- Postal Code: 77580
- Area code: 998
- Website: www.puertomorelos.gob.mx

Puerto Morelos (Spanish pronunciation: ['pweɾto mo'ɾelos]) is a municipality, town, and seaport in Quintana Roo, Mexico's easternmost state, on the Yucatán Peninsula. The town is located in the northeast of the state, about 36 km (22 mi) south of the resort city of Cancún, and about 30 km (19 mi) north of the city of Playa del Carmen.

Puerto Morelos merged with the village of Leona Vicario on December 6, 2015, to form the municipality of Puerto Morelos, the 11th municipality in Quintana Roo, separating from its former municipality of Benito Juárez.

Puerto Morelos is a small coastal village with two main roads running along the shoreline. The village includes a variety of tourist-oriented shops, restaurants, and cafés. Despite its modest size, it offers a relatively wide range of amenities for both residents and visitors.

== History ==
It has historically been the main port between the mainland of Quintana Roo and the island of Cozumel, and an automobile ferry used to run from Puerto Morelos to Cozumel. The town is named after Independence leader José María Morelos.

Resorts are abundant in the Puerto Morelos region along the Riviera Maya and attractions, such as the Crococun Crocodile Zoo, the Botanical Garden, and a host of cenotes are also increasing in number. Recently new smaller inns have been built which offers an evening programs of Talks on local history, marine biology, and healthy living practices.

One hundred meters off shore lies the Puerto Morelos portion of the Mesoamerican Barrier Reef System, designated as a National Marine Park in 1998 due to local environmental activists.

== Geography ==
Puerto Morelos is divided by a highway and a mangrove swamp into three sections. The section west of the highway is known as "Colonia Joaquin Zetina Gazca". The section east of the highway is called "Colonia Pescadores". The section on the coast east of the mangrove swamp is "Puerto" or "Antiguo (old) Puerto Morelos". This original coastal fishing village is now a quiet, mixed-use neighborhood of private homes, hotels, condominiums, restaurants, and tourist shops.

The second part is about 2 km. inland and adjacent to Highway 307, on the western side. The inland portion is mainly single level dwellings for local workers. New residential developments have sprung up in recent years adding to the housing mix. There are now multi-story apartment buildings, and private residential developments between the highway and the mangrove where one can buy lots and build a house of one's own design.

=== Climate ===
Classified by Köppen-Geiger system as tropical wet and dry climate (Aw), because its driest month has less than 60 millimetres (2.4 in) of precipitation and also less than 100 − (total annual precipitation [mm]/25), also because each month has a mean average above 18 °C (64 °F).

Climate data for Puerto Morelos (1951–2010)
Month	Jan	Feb	Mar	Apr	May	Jun	Jul	Aug	Sep	Oct	Nov	Dec	Year
Record high °C (°F)	34.5 (94.1)	36.5 (97.7)	38.0 (100.4)	39.5 (103.1)	41.5 (106.7)	40.5 (104.9)	39.0 (102.2)	41.0 (105.8)	41.0 (105.8)	39.0 (102.2)	38.0 (100.4)	35.0 (95.0)	41.5 (106.7)
Mean daily maximum °C (°F)	28.2 (82.8)	28.6 (83.5)	29.7 (85.5)	31.2 (88.2)	32.3 (90.1)	32.4 (90.3)	33.0 (91.4)	33.3 (91.9)	32.3 (90.1)	31.2 (88.2)	29.7 (85.5)	28.4 (83.1)	30.9 (87.6)
Daily mean °C (°F)	23.3 (73.9)	23.4 (74.1)	24.8 (76.6)	26.7 (80.1)	27.8 (82.0)	28.1 (82.6)	28.4 (83.1)	28.3 (82.9)	27.8 (82.0)	26.6 (79.9)	25.0 (77.0)	23.7 (74.7)	26.2 (79.2)
Mean daily minimum °C (°F)	18.4 (65.1)	18.2 (64.8)	20.0 (68.0)	22.2 (72.0)	23.3 (73.9)	23.7 (74.7)	23.8 (74.8)	23.3 (73.9)	23.3 (73.9)	21.9 (71.4)	20.4 (68.7)	19.0 (66.2)	21.5 (70.7)
Record low °C (°F)	5.0 (41.0)	6.0 (42.8)	8.0 (46.4)	9.0 (48.2)	12.0 (53.6)	12.0 (53.6)	17.0 (62.6)	12.0 (53.6)	17.0 (62.6)	12.0 (53.6)	10.0 (50.0)	9.0 (48.2)	5.0 (41.0)
Average rainfall mm (inches)	78.6 (3.09)	45.2 (1.78)	42.3 (1.67)	54.0 (2.13)	102.0 (4.02)	138.3 (5.44)	90.3 (3.56)	126.7 (4.99)	187.1 (7.37)	184.0 (7.24)	98.8 (3.89)	74.7 (2.94)	1,222 (48.11)
Average rainy days (≥ 0.1 mm)	6.4	3.9	3.1	3.2	5.4	8.9	7.8	9.8	12.9	11.8	8.7	7.0	88.9
Source: Servicio Meteorologico Nacional

== Demographics ==
Puerto Morelos has grown rapidly with the development of tourism and as of the 2010 census is the home to 9,188 people.

Population of Puerto Morelos
Year	Pop.	±% p.a.
1980	672	—
1990	740	+0.97%
1995	829	+2.30%
2000	892	+1.48%
2005	1,097	+4.22%
2010	9,188	+52.97%

== Infrastructure ==
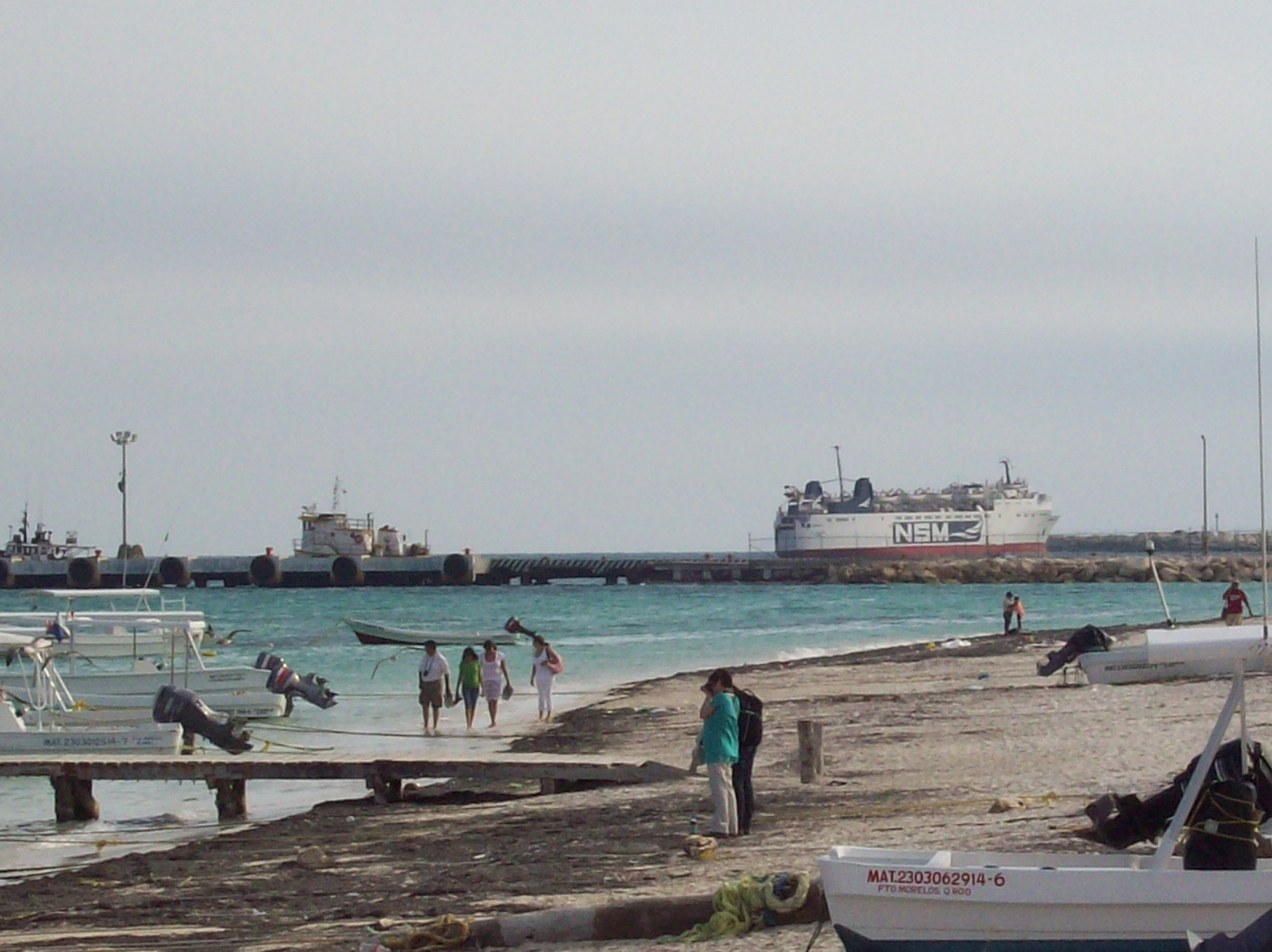
Puerto Morelos Marine Terminal in the background

The marine terminal at Puerto Morelos is equipped to handle containers and is an important seaport in the state of Quintana Roo. The volume of cargo handled in the port of Puerto Morelos amounted to 41.2 thousand metric tons in 2019.

Puerto Morelos

History
- Opened: 15 March 2024

Services
Preceding station	Tren Maya	Following station
Playa del Carmen toward Palenque	Tren Maya	Cancún Airport Terminus
Location

In addition, there is a Tren Maya station that opened to the public on 15 March 2024 just outside Puerto Morelos.
