= Nuevo Xcán railway station =

Railway station in Quintana Roo, Mexico

Nuevo Xcán

General information
- Location: Nuevo Xcán, Quintana Roo, Mexico
- Coordinates: 20.87907°N 87.60277°W
- Platforms: 2
- Tracks: 4

Services
Preceding station	Tren Maya	Following station
Valladolid toward Palenque	Tren Maya	Leona Vicario toward Cancún Airport

Nuevo Xcán is a train station in the municipality of Lázaro Cárdenas, Quintana Roo. The station connects and serves local transportation and tourism with the Holbox area.

== Tren Maya ==
Andrés Manuel López Obrador announced the Tren Maya project in his 2018 presidential campaign. On 13 August 2018, he announced the complete outline. The new Tren Maya put Nuevo Xcán on the route connecting Valladolid railway station, Yucatán and Cancún Airport railway station, Quintana Roo.

== Characteristics ==
The design of the station was designed according to the conditions of the area. The space has a series of natural elements such as gardens and vegetation typical of the local area.

The cobbled pavement on the main road is made of limestone, while the secondary roads and viewpoints is made of sascab and the retaining walls will be made of stone material. It also has sustainable spaces with natural elements.
