= Carlos Joaquín González =

Governor of Quintana Roo, Mexico

Carlos Manuel Joaquín González
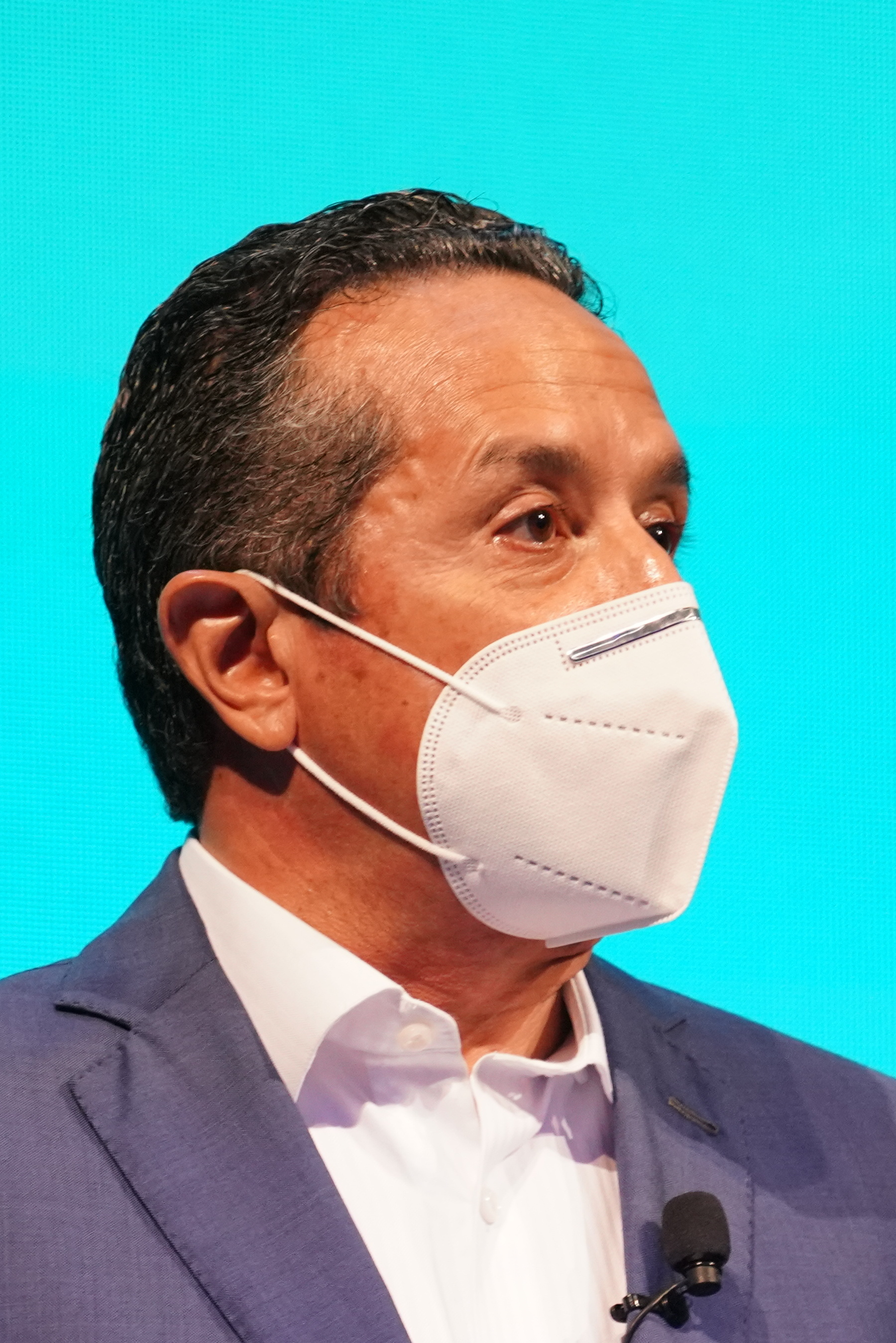
- Joaquín in 2021

8th Governor of Quintana Roo
- In office 25 September 2016 – 24 September 2022
- Preceded by: Roberto Borge Angulo
- Succeeded by: Mara Lezama Espinosa

Member of the Chamber of Deputies for Quintana Roo′s 3rd district
- In office 1 September 2009 – 31 August 2012
- Preceded by: Yolanda Garmendia
- Succeeded by: Graciela Saldaña Fraire

Municipal President of Solidaridad
- In office 10 April 2005 – 9 April 2008
- Preceded by: José Gabriel Mendicuti Loria
- Succeeded by: Eduardo Quian Alcocer

Personal details
- Born: January 6, 1965 (age 61) Cancún, Quintana Roo, Mexico
- Party: PRD (Until 2022)
- Education: Autonomous University of Yucatan (BS)
- Occupation: Politician

Carlos Manuel Joaquín González (born January 6, 1965) is a Mexican politician. He was the governor of the state of Quintana Roo from 2016 to 2022 and, from 2009 to 2012, he sat in the Chamber of Deputies representing Quintana Roo's third district. In March 2023, he was appointed Ambassador of Mexico to Canada.

== Life ==
Joaquín González was born on January 6, 1965, in Cancún, the half brother of Pedro Joaquín Coldwell, a former PRI president, senator and former Secretary of Energy. He obtained his undergraduate degree in public accounting from the Universidad Autónoma de Yucatán in 1988. Through the 1980s and 1990s, he worked for various companies; he supervised the auditing department of Hidrogenadora Yucateca, S.A. de C.V. from 1984 to 1988 and worked as an operations manager at other southeastern Mexican companies, including Aerovias Caribe, S.A. de C.V. (1988–90) and Portatel del Sureste, S.A. de C.V. (1990–2001). He also specialized in senior management at Tec de Monterrey.

In 1999, he became an active member of the Institutional Revolutionary Party (PRI). He served as the treasurer of Solidaridad, Quintana Roo (the municipality containing Playa del Carmen) from 2002 to 2005 and was municipal president from 2005 to 2008. Also in 2008, he served as president of the Association of Coastal Municipalities of Mexico. For one year after leaving Solidaridad, Joaquín González became the secretary of tourism for Quintana Roo.

In the 2009 mid-terms, Joaquín González won election to the 61st session of Congress as a federal deputy representing the third district of Quintana Roo, which includes Cancún. He presided over the Tourism Commission and served on the Navy and Fishing Commissions during his three years in San Lázaro.

After his time as a federal deputy, Joaquín González was designated as Subsecretary of Operations, and later as Subsecretary of Innovation and Tourist Development, in the Secretariat of Tourism. He resigned from SECTUR in January 2016 and intended to seek the PRI's candidacy for governor of Quintana Roo for the second time; in 2010, he was defeated in the internal election by Roberto Borge, who went on to become governor.

On February 9, however, Joaquín González left the PRI after 17 years, claiming that a group within the state party led by Governor Roberto Borge was not letting him run for governor. One of his exploratory pre-campaign events was shut down by local and state officials for not notifying civil protection authorities. He would later call the state party "closed, corrupt, complicated", exclusive and discriminatory. Two days later, Joaquín González accepted the invitation of the PAN-PRD coalition to become the alliance's candidate for the gubernatorial elections, registering as a member of the latter party.

In the gubernatorial elections held on June 5, 2016, Joaquín González and the PAN-PRD alliance defeated Mauricio Góngora, the PRI candidate, by ten percentage points.
