= María Concepción Fajardo =

Mexican politician

- Born: Estado de México, Mexico
- Occupation: Politician
- Political party: PRI

María Concepción Fajardo Muñoz is a Mexican politician affiliated with the Institutional Revolutionary Party (PRI). In 2004–2006 she sat in the Chamber of Deputies during the 59th session of Congress representing Quintana Roo's first district as the alternate of Félix González Canto.
