= Eduardo Quian Alcocer =

Mexican politician (born 1967)

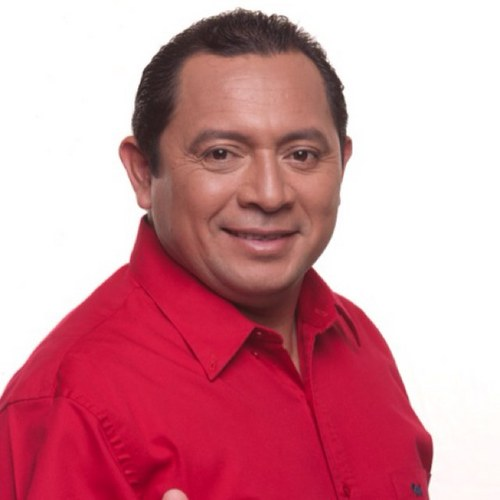

Municipal President of Solidaridad
- In office 10 April 2008 – 20 March 2010
- Preceded by: Carlos Joaquín González
- Succeeded by: Filiberto Martínez Méndez

Personal details
- Born: 1 December 1967 (age 58) Michoacán, Mexico
- Party: PRI
- Occupation: Politician

Eduardo Román Quian Alcocer (born 1 December 1967) is a Mexican politician affiliated with the Institutional Revolutionary Party (PRI). In the 2012 general election he was elected to the Chamber of Deputies to represent Quintana Roo's first district during the 62nd session of Congress.
