= Pedro Joaquín Coldwell =

Mexican politician

Pedro Joaquin Coldwell
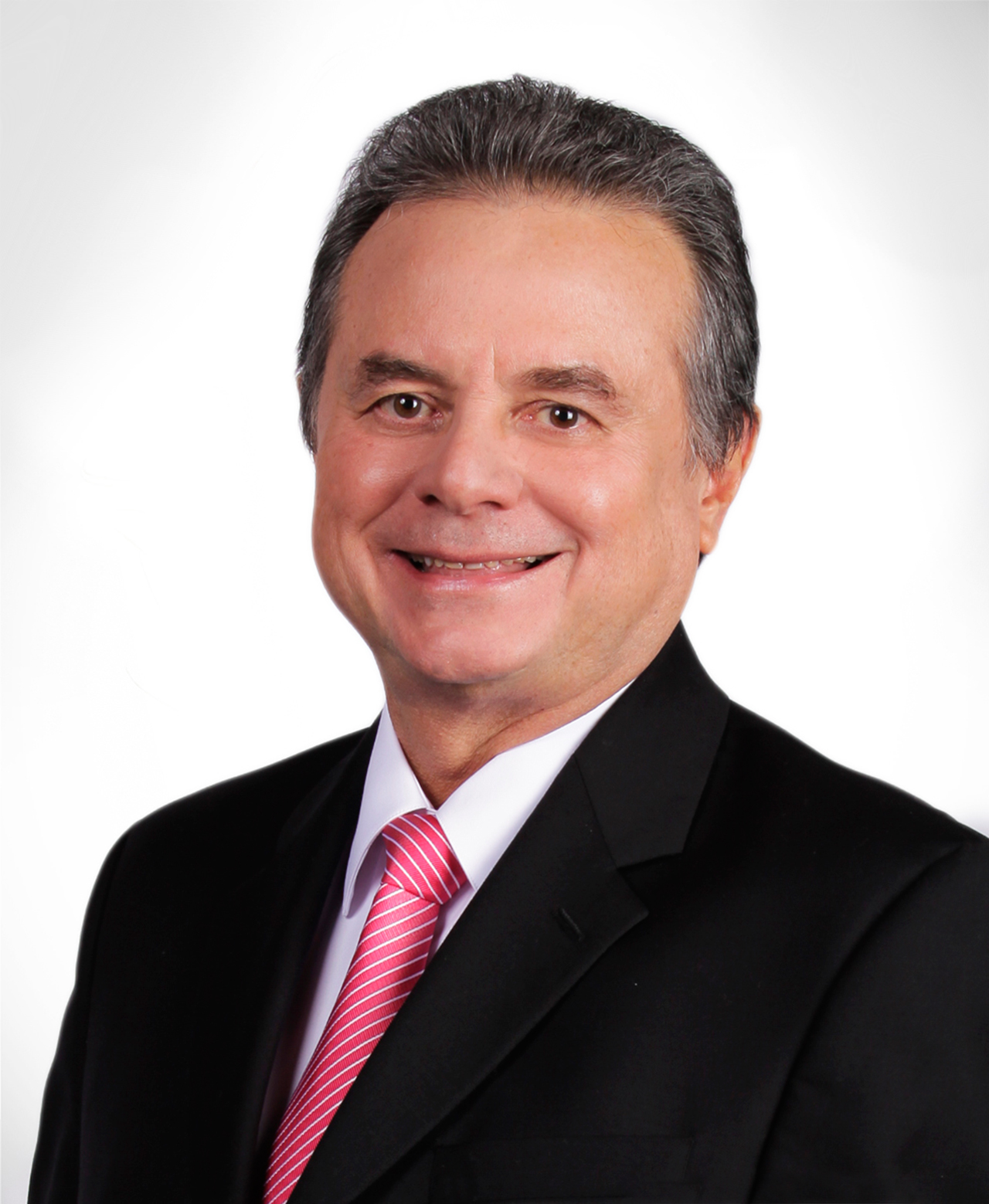

Secretary of Energy
- In office 1 December 2012 – 30 November 2018
- President: Enrique Peña Nieto
- Preceded by: Jordy Herrera Flores
- Succeeded by: Rocío Nahle García

President of the Institutional Revolutionary Party
- In office 8 December 2011 – 30 November 2012
- Preceded by: Cristina Díaz
- Succeeded by: Cristina Díaz

Senator for Quintana Roo
- In office 1 September 2006 – 31 August 2012
- Preceded by: Addy Joaquín Coldwell
- Succeeded by: Jorge Emilio González

Secretary of Tourism
- In office 5 January 1990 – 14 December 1993
- President: Carlos Salinas de Gortari
- Preceded by: Carlos Hank González
- Succeeded by: Jesús Silva Herzog Flores

Governor of Quintana Roo
- In office 5 April 1981 – 4 April 1987
- Preceded by: Jesús Martínez Ross
- Succeeded by: Miguel Borge Martín

Personal details
- Born: 5 August 1950 (age 76) Cozumel, Quintana Roo, Mexico
- Party: Institutional Revolutionary
- Education: Universidad Iberoamericana
- Occupation: Lawyer; Politician

Pedro Joaquín Coldwell (Note: In this Mexican name, the surname is Joaquín and the second or maternal family name is Coldwell.) (born 5 August 1950) is a Mexican politician affiliated with the Institutional Revolutionary Party (PRI).

== Personal life and education ==
Born in Cozumel, Quintana Roo, Joaquín Coldwell studied law at the Universidad Iberoamericana. He is the son of Nassin Joaquín Ibarra, a businessman from Cozumel. He is of Lebanese and English descent. His siblings include Addy Joaquín Coldwell, a former member of the Chamber of Deputies, and Carlos Joaquín González, who was governor of Quintana Roo in 2016–2022.

== Political career ==
Joaquín Coldwell has held various positions within the Institutional Revolutionary Party (PRI) and in public service. He served as director general of the National Fund for Tourism Development (FONATUR) from 1988 to 1990 and as the party's general secretary in 1994–1995. From 1979 to 1980, he was a member of the Chamber of Deputies representing the Quintana Roo's 1st congressional district. He later served as governor of Quintana Roo from 1981 to 1987. In 1990, President Carlos Salinas de Gortari appointed him Secretary of Tourism, where he served from 1990 to 1993. Joaquín Coldwell also succeeded Marco Antonio Bernal as Peace and Reconciliation Commissioner in Chiapas. In 1998, President Ernesto Zedillo appointed him Ambassador of Mexico to Cuba.

In the general election held on 2 July 2006, he was elected to the Senate for the PRI, representing the state of Quintana Roo. On 30 November 2012, incoming president Enrique Peña Nieto announced that Joaquín Coldwell was to serve in his cabinet as secretary of energy.

== Notes ==
Political offices
Preceded by Jordy Herrera Flores	Secretary of Energy; 2012–2018	Succeeded by Rocío Nahle García
Preceded by Carlos Hank González	Secretary of Tourism; 1990–1994	Succeeded by Jesús Silva Herzog
Preceded by Jesús Martínez Ross	Governor of Quintana Roo; 1981–1987	Succeeded by Miguel Borge Martín
Assembly seats
Preceded by Addy Joaquín Coldwell	Senator for Quintana Roo; 2006–2012	Succeeded by TBD
Party political offices
Preceded by Cristina Díaz	President of the Institutional Revolutionary Party; 2011	Succeeded by Cristina Díaz
