= Coldwell =

Coldwell may refer to:

== People ==
- Addy Joaquín Coldwell (born 1939), Mexican politician
- Bill Coldwell (1932–1995), English football manager and scout
- Cec Coldwell (1929–2008), English footballer and team manager
- George R. Coldwell (1858–1924), Canadian politician
- Len Coldwell (1933–1996), English cricketer
- Martha Coldwell (born 2010), Mexican rhythmic gymnast
- M. J. Coldwell (1888–1974), Canadian politician
- Pattie Coldwell (1952–2002), British TV presenter and journalist
- Paul Coldwell (born 1952), British artist
- Pedro Joaquín Coldwell (born 1950), Mexican politician
- Robert Coldwell Wood (1923–2005), American administrator
- Terry Coldwell, member of band East 17

== Places ==
- Rural Municipality of Coldwell, Manitoba, Canada

== Other uses ==
- Maggie Coldwell, a character from the TV series Casualty
- Coldwell Complex, an igneous intrusion
- Coldwell Banker, an American real estate franchise

== See also ==
- Caldwell (surname)
