= Yolanda Garmendia Hernández =

Mexican politician

- Born: 24 September 1954 (age 71); Mexico City, Mexico
- Occupation: Politician
- Political party: PAN

Yolanda Mercedes Garmendia Hernández (born 24 September 1954) is a Mexican politician from the National Action Party (PAN). In the 2006 general election she was elected to the Chamber of Deputies to represent Quintana Roo's newly created third district during the 60th session of Congress.
