= Leona Vicario, Quintana Roo =

Coordinates: 20°59′32″N 87°12′10″W

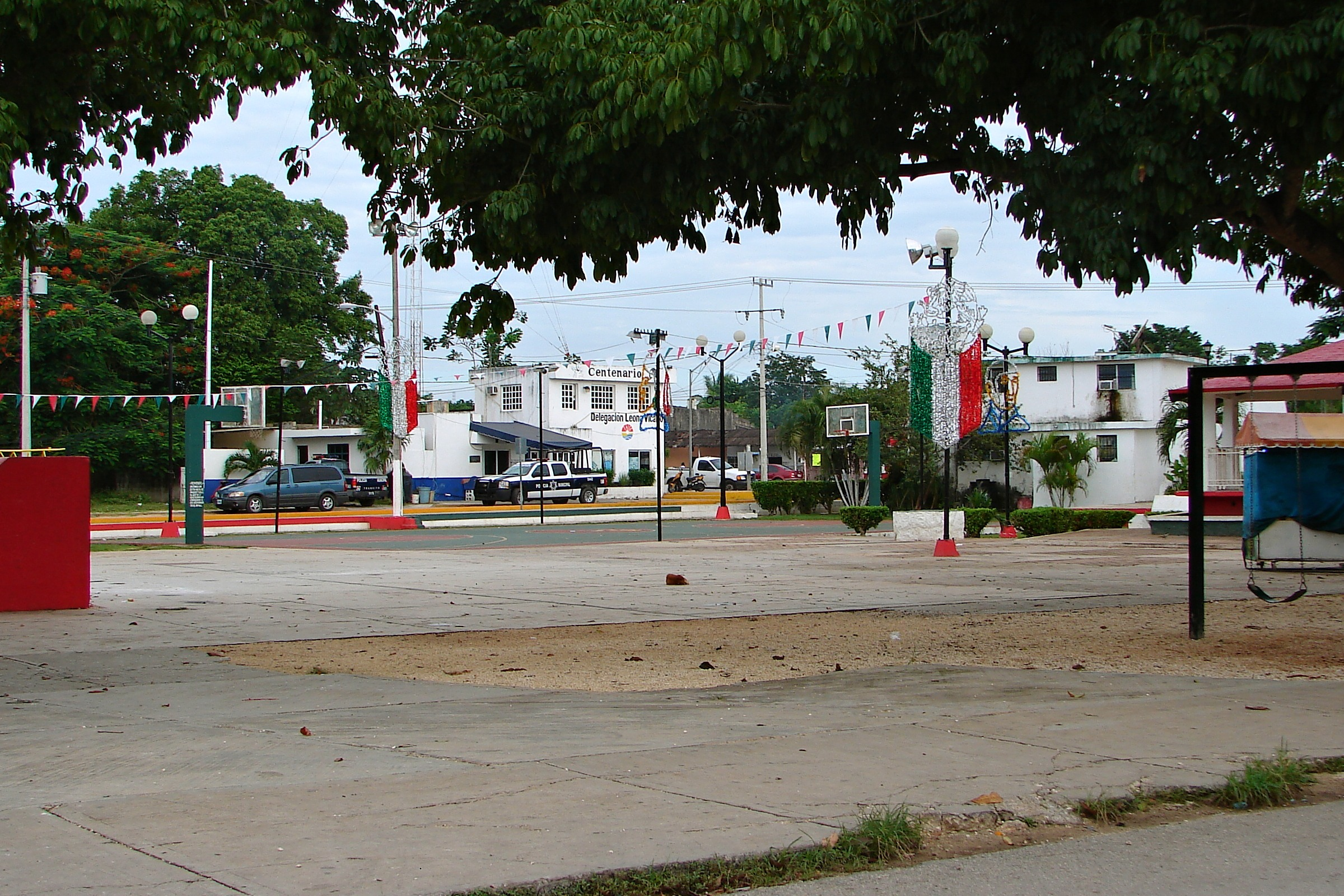
Central plaza in Leona Vicario

Leona Vicario is one of the communities in the municipality of Puerto Morelos, Quintana Roo. The town is named for Leona Vicario the wife of Mexican Independence figure Andrés Quintana Roo. Its population was 6,791 inhabitants at the 2020 census. It is located in the western part of the municipality and lies at an elevation of 10 metres (33 ft) above sea level. Leona Vicario railway station is just outside the town.
