= Alicia Ricalde Magaña =

Mexican politician (born 1965)

- Born: 10 November 1965 (age 60); Quintana Roo, Mexico
- Occupation: Deputy
- Political party: PAN

Alicia Concepción Ricalde Magaña (born 10 November 1965) is a Mexican politician affiliated with the National Action Party (PAN). In the 2012 general election she was elected to the Chamber of Deputies to represent Quintana Roo's third district during the 62nd session of Congress.

She also served as a member of the Congress of Quintana Roo from 1996 to 1999, as the alternate deputy for Quintana Roo's first district in 2001–2003, and as municipal president of Islas Mujeres from 2008 to 2011.
