= Valladolid railway station =

Railway station in Yucatán, Mexico

Valladolid
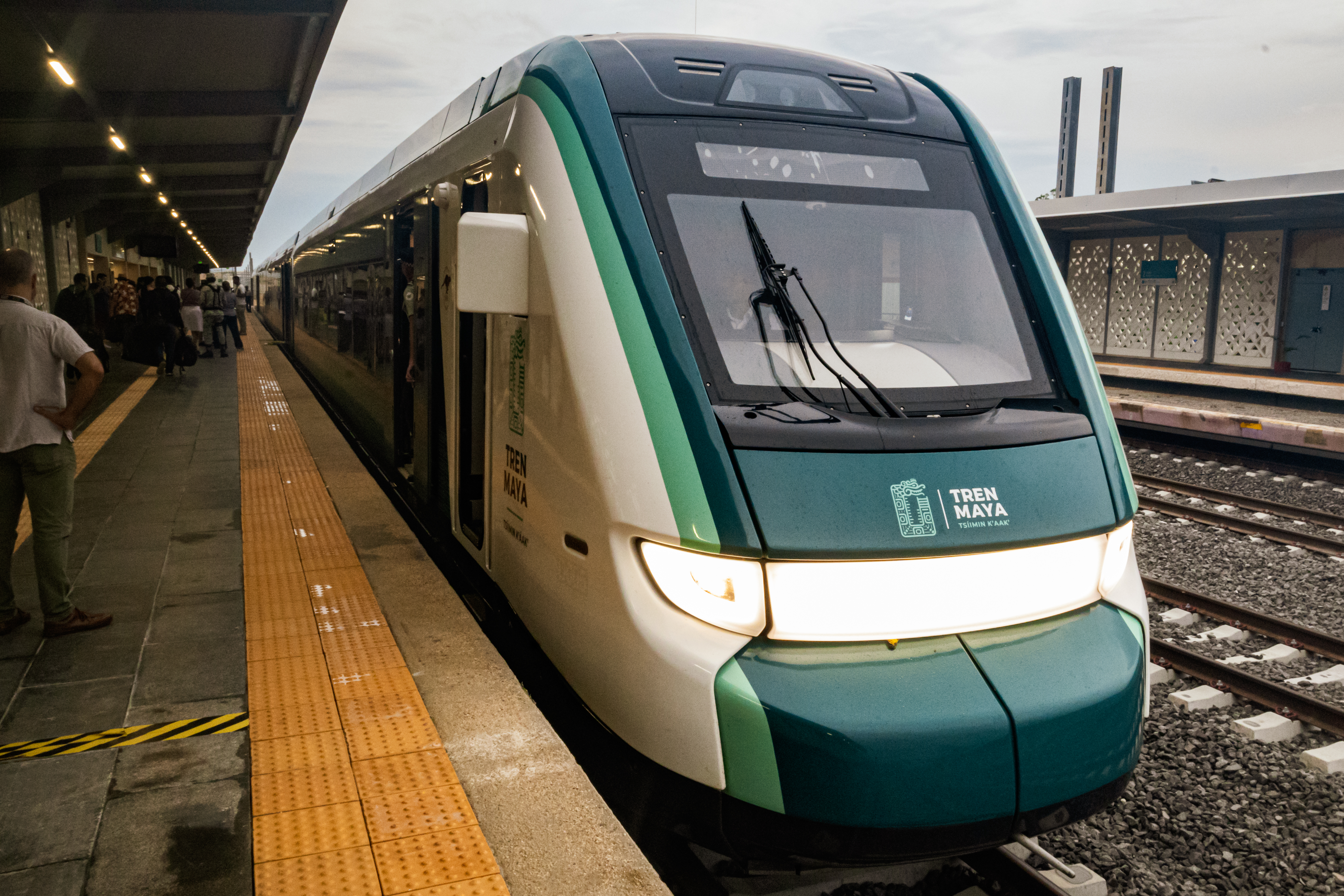

General information
- Location: Valladolid, Yucatán, Mexico
- Coordinates: 20.73964°N 88.19232°W
- Platforms: 2
- Tracks: 4

History
- Opened: January 2024

Services
Preceding station	Tren Maya	Following station
Chichén Itzá toward Palenque	Tren Maya	Nuevo Xcán toward Cancún Airport
Location

Valladolid station is a train station 5 km north of Valladolid, Yucatán.

== Background ==
Andrés Manuel López Obrador announced the Tren Maya project in his 2018 presidential campaign. On 13 August 2018, he announced the complete outline. The new Tren Maya put Valladolid station on the route connecting Mérida, Yucatán and Cancún, Quintana Roo.

Valladolid serves as a station on Section 4 of the Maya Train, in the state of Yucatán.

== Characteristics ==
According to the architects involved in designing the station, the design is based on a sustainability approach that meets several aspects, relating to vegetation and economics. As one of the architects, Román Cordero Tovar, said, “it is a structure that rescues rails to make pergolas, sleepers to make plazas”.

At the top of the entrances (called "portals"), there is a solar panel that captures the sun's energy. As a result, 50% of the station will use clean energy. “a glass that has a photovoltaic panel embedded in it”.

The project is also planned to "age with dignity", meaning that not much work is done to maintain it from time to time. It contains materials that do not require frequent cleaning.
