= Puerto Morelos Municipality =

Puerto Morelos
- Municipality
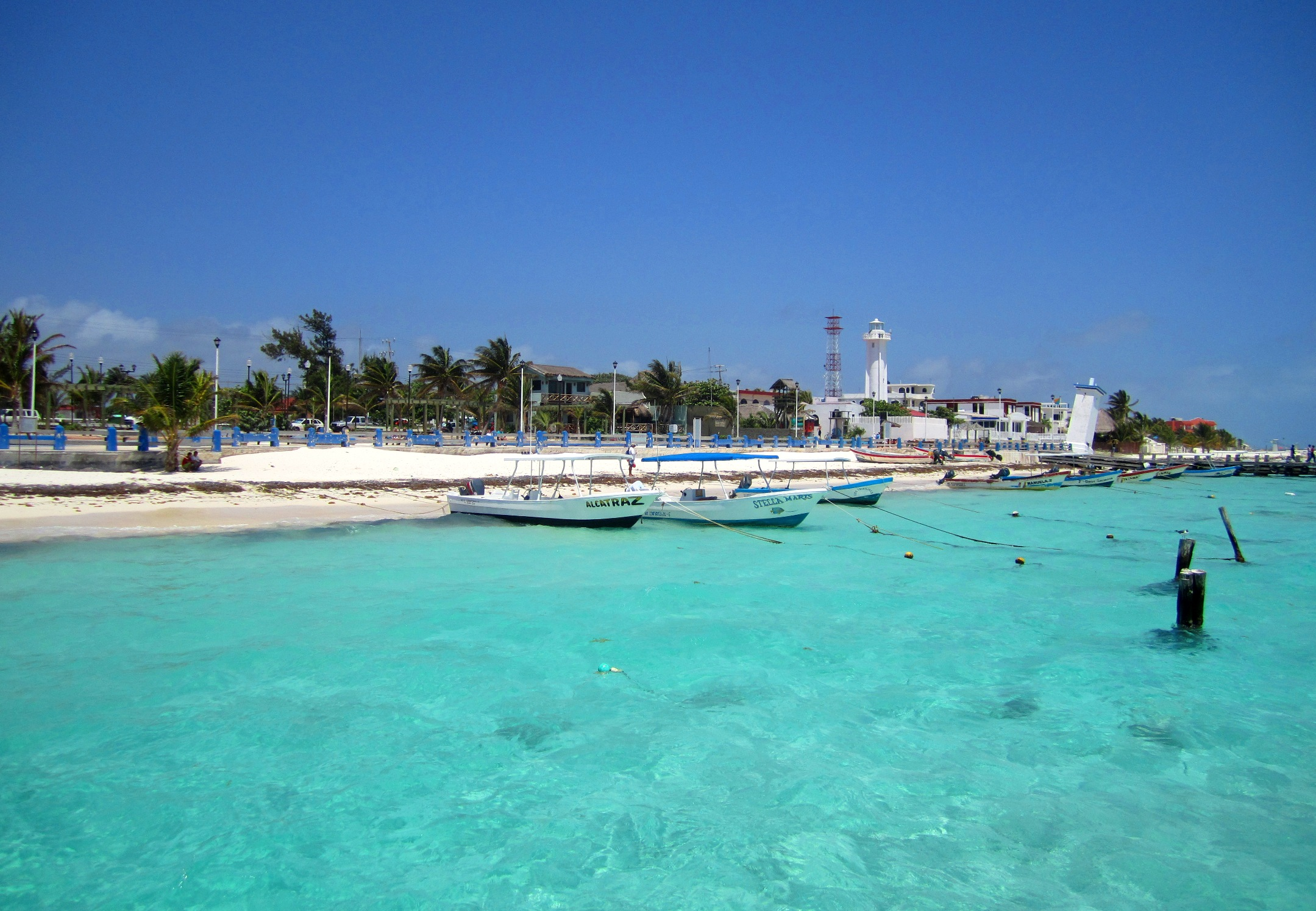
- Puerto Morelos beach

- Coat of arms

- Location of the Municipality in the State

- Location within Mexico
- Coordinates: 20°55′N 87°06′W
- Country: Mexico
- State: Quintana Roo
- Municipal seat: Puerto Morelos

Government
  - Municipal President: Laura Fernández Piña; Ana Luisa Betancourt Canul (Interim)

Area
  - Total: 1,100 km^{2} (420 sq mi)
- Elevation: 1 m (3.3 ft)

Population (2020 census)
  - Total: 26,921
- Time zone: UTC−5 (Southeastern Time Zone)
- INEGI Code: 23011
- Website: www.puertomorelos.gob.mx

Puerto Morelos is one of the eleven municipalities of the Mexican state of Quintana Roo, on the Yucatán Peninsula. It was formed in 2016 from the localities of Puerto Morelos, Leona Vicario and Central Vallarta previously belonging to the municipality of Benito Juárez. In the 2010 census, these three localities recorded a total of 15,725 inhabitants.

The municipal seat is the town of Puerto Morelos, which is located about 13 kilometres (8.1 mi) southwest of Cancún on the Caribbean Sea and is the easternmost municipal seat in Mexico.

Joaquín Zetina Gasca is one of the communities in the municipality and the location of the municipal offices.

Ignacio Sánchez Cordero, who sought the candidacy of MORENA and PVEM for mayor, was assassinated on February 24, 2021.

== Municipal presidents ==
- Leonel Medina Mendoza, 2016-2019
- Laura Fernández Piña, 2019-2021
- Ana Luisa Betancourt Canul (Interim), starting March 8, 2021
