= Joaquín Zetina Gasca, Quintana Roo =

Neighborhood in Puerto Morelos, Quintana Roo, Mexico

Coordinates: 20°51′30″N 86°54′00″W

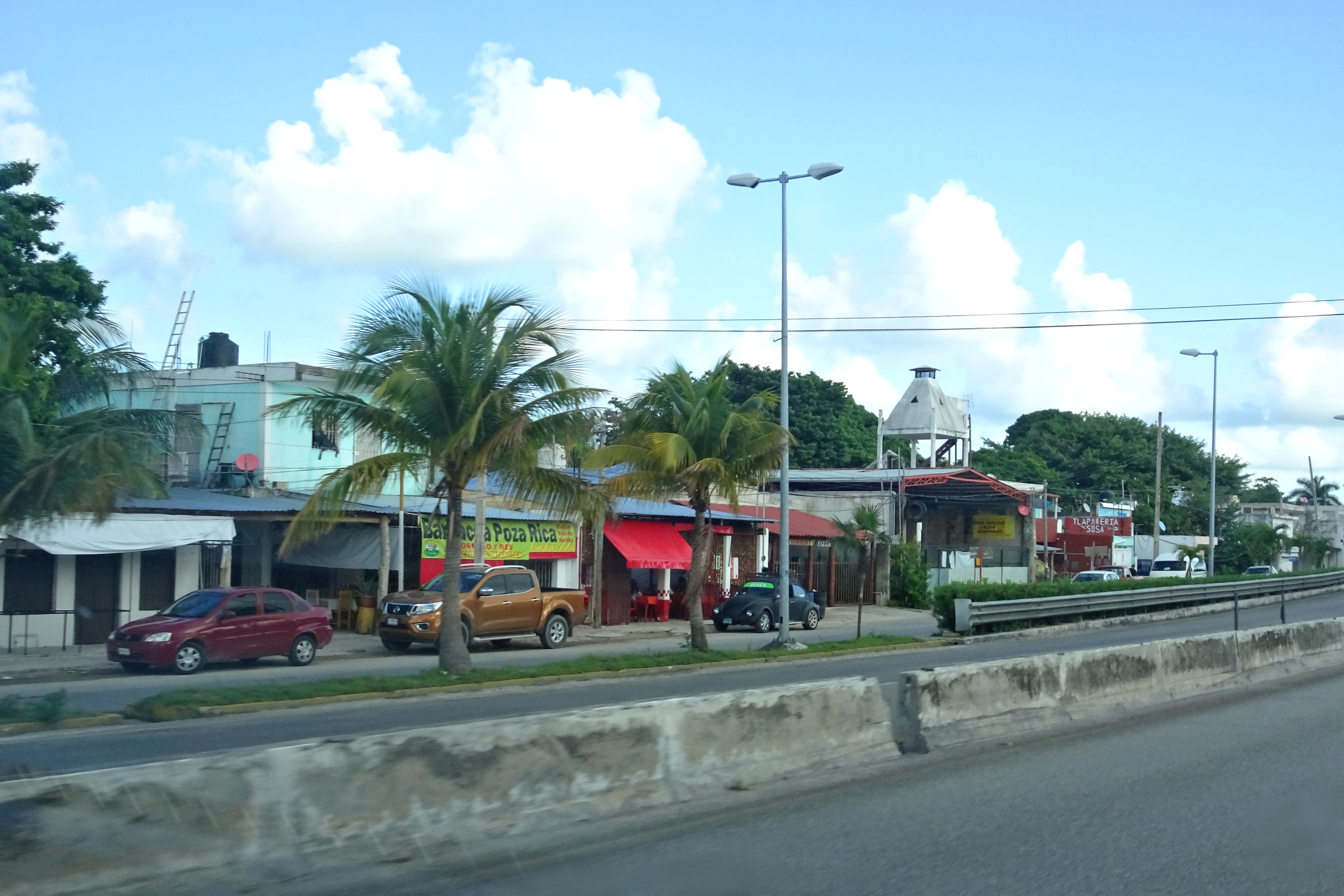
Joaquín Zetina Gasca seen from Highway 307

Joaquín Zetina Gasca is a neighbourhood within the Municipality of Puerto Morelos, Quintana Roo, Mexico, better known as the "Colonia" area of the municipality.

In addition to the Zetina Gasca neighbourhood, there are several developments that are fraccionamentos or barrios of their own. There is the "Puerto" area, several blocks of beach houses and small hotels beyond the mangroves, about 3 kilometres (1.9 mi) from the "Colonia Joaquin Zetina Gasca" (a.k.a. Colonia). Plus, surrounding the "Colonia", there are: Villas 1, Villas 2 and Villas la Playa (Villas 4), and Pescadores.

As of 2017, there are also now the Palma Real, Alborada, Palma Grand, Puerto Marino, El Faro and Veredas developments which are gated communities close within the range, but not part of the older "Colonia" area, which sports many restaurants, taco stands, grocery and vegetable stores and 2 supermarkets (AKI and Chedraui).

The municipal offices are located in and around the "Colonia" area.
