= Mara Lezama =

Mexican journalist and politician

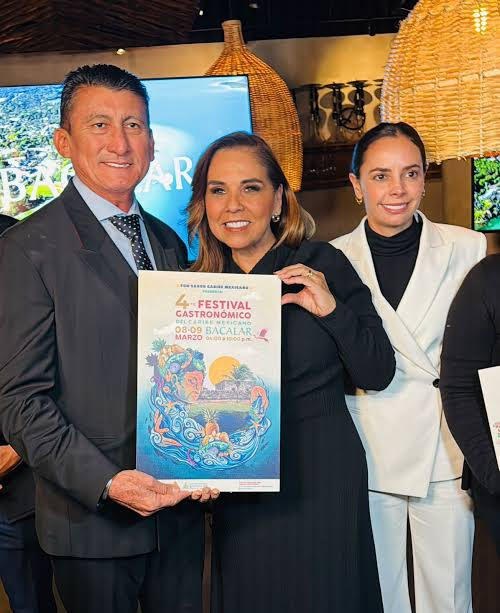
- Lezama (middle) in 2025

9th Governor of Quintana Roo
- Incumbent
- Assumed office 25 September 2022
- Preceded by: Carlos Joaquín González

Personal details
- Born: María Elena Hermelinda Lezama Espinosa; 29 September 1968 (age 57) Mexico City
- Party: National Regeneration Movement (2015–present)
- Spouse: Omar Terrazas García
- Children: 3
- Occupation: Politician and journalist

María Elena Hermelinda Lezama Espinosa (born 29 September 1968), known as Mara Lezama, is a Mexican journalist and politician from the Morena party. She is the current Governor of Quintana Roo, becoming the first woman to govern the state.

== Political career ==
She was the mayor of Benito Juárez from 2021 to 2022. She then became a candidate for Governor of Quintana Roo, supported by the Juntos Hacemos Historia alliance in the 2022 local elections, which she eventually won.

In October 2024, she ordered the evacuation of Isla Holbox as a result of Hurricane Milton.
