= Graciela Saldaña Fraire =

Mexican politician

- Born: 4 February 1961 (age 65); Venustiano Carranza, D.F., Mexico
- Occupation: Politician
- Political party: PRD

Graciela Saldaña Fraire (born 4 February 1961) is a Mexican politician affiliated with the Party of the Democratic Revolution (PRD).

In the 2012 general election she was elected to the Chamber of Deputies to represent Quintana Roo's third district during the 62nd session of Congress.
