= 3rd federal electoral district of Quintana Roo =

Federal electoral district of Mexico

Quintana Roo's 3rd
- Electoral district of the Chamber of Deputies of Mexico

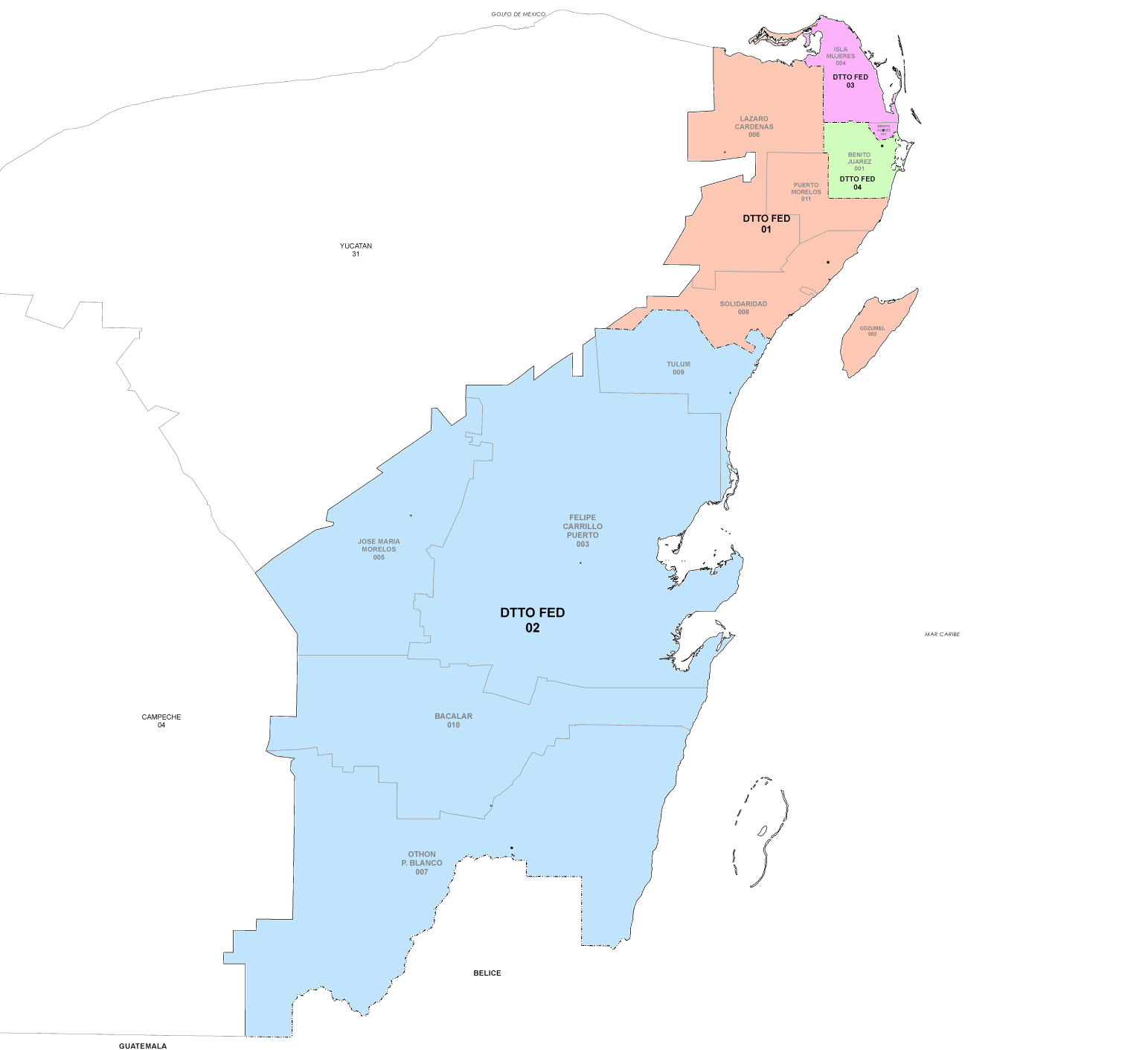
- 3rd district since 2023

Incumbent
- Member: Luis Humberto Aldana
- Party: ▌Morena
- Congress: 66th (2024–2027)

District
- State: Quintana Roo
- Head town: Cancún
- Coordinates: 21°09′N 86°50′W
- Covers: Benito Juárez (part), Isla Mujeres
- PR region: Third
- Precincts: 331
- Population: 472,401 (2020 census)

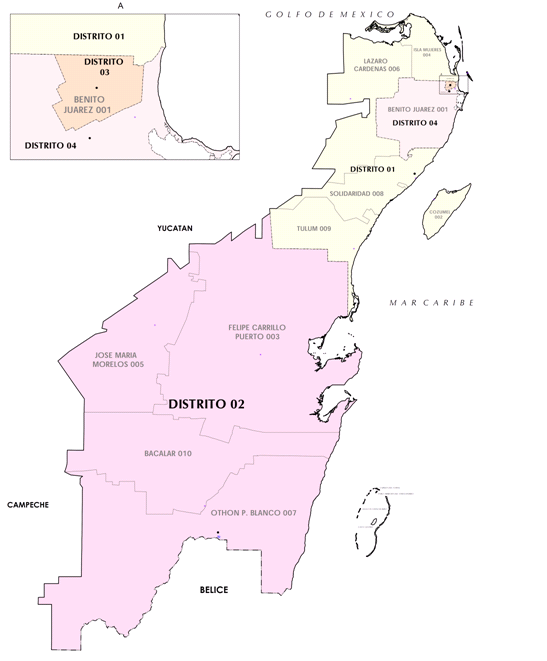
Quintana Roo under the 2017–2022 plan

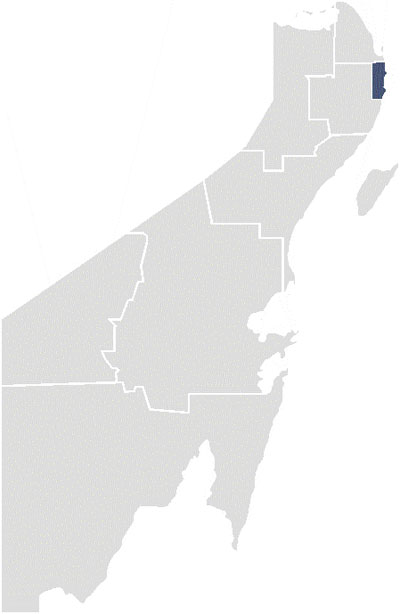
3rd district between 2005 and 2017

The 3rd federal electoral district of Quintana Roo (Spanish: Distrito electoral federal 03 de Quintana Roo) is one of the 300 electoral districts into which Mexico is divided for elections to the federal Chamber of Deputies and one of four such districts in the state of Quintana Roo.

It elects one deputy to the lower house of Congress for each three-year legislative session by means of the first-past-the-post system. Votes cast in the district also count towards the calculation of proportional representation ("plurinominal") deputies elected from the third region.

The 3rd district was created as part of the 2005 redistricting process and was first contested in the 2006 general election.

The current member for the district, elected in the 2024 general election, is Luis Humberto Aldana Navarro of the National Regeneration Movement (Morena).

== District territory ==
Under the 2023 districting plan adopted by the National Electoral Institute (INE), which is to be used for the 2024, 2027 and 2030 federal elections, the 3rd district covers the 10 precincts (secciones electorales) that make up the municipality of Isla Mujeres and 321 precincts in the neighbouring municipality of Benito Juárez.

The head town (cabecera distrital), where results from individual polling stations are gathered together and tallied, is the city of Cancún, the municipal seat of Benito Juárez. The district reported a population of 472,401 in the 2020 census.

== Previous districting schemes ==
Evolution of electoral district numbers
	1973	1974	1978	1996	2005	2017	2023
Quintana Roo	1	2	2	2	3	4	4
Chamber of Deputies	194	196	300				

2017–2022

The 2017 redistricting process assigned Quintana Roo its 4th district. From 2017 to 2022, the 3rd district had its head town at Cancún and it comprised 242 precincts in the municipality of Benito Juárez.

2005–2017

The 3rd district was created under the 2005 districting scheme, from the portion of the 2nd district corresponding to the urban area of the municipality of Benito Juárez: i.e., the city and resort of Cancún, which served as the head town.

== Deputies returned to Congress ==
(Mexico) National parties
- Current
- PAN
- PRI
- PT
- PVEM
- MC
- Morena
- PAZ
- Somos
- Defunct or local only
- PLM
- PNR
- PRM
- PNM
- PP
- PPS
- PARM
- PFCRN
- CON
- PANAL
- PSD
- PES
- PES
- PRD

Quintana Roo's 3rd district
Election	Deputy	Party	Term	Legislature
2006	Yolanda Garmendia Hernández	National Action Party (Mexico)	2006–2009	60th Congress
2009	Carlos Joaquín González	Institutional Revolutionary Party	2009–2012	61st Congress
2012	Graciela Saldaña Fraire	Party of the Democratic Revolution	2012–2015	62nd Congress
2015	Remberto Estrada Barba	Ecologist Green Party of Mexico	2015–2018	63rd Congress
2018	Mildred Ávila Vera	National Regeneration Movement	2018–2021	64th Congress
2021	Alberto Batun Chulim	National Regeneration Movement	2021–2024	65th Congress
2024	Luis Humberto Aldana Navarro	National Regeneration Movement	2024–2027	66th Congress

== Presidential elections ==
Quintana Roo's 3rd district
Election	District won by	Party or coalition	%
2018	Andrés Manuel López Obrador	Juntos Haremos Historia	76.4088
2024	Claudia Sheinbaum Pardo	Sigamos Haciendo Historia	78.3698
