= 4th federal electoral district of Quintana Roo =

Federal electoral district of Mexico

Quintana Roo's 4th
- Electoral district of the Chamber of Deputies of Mexico

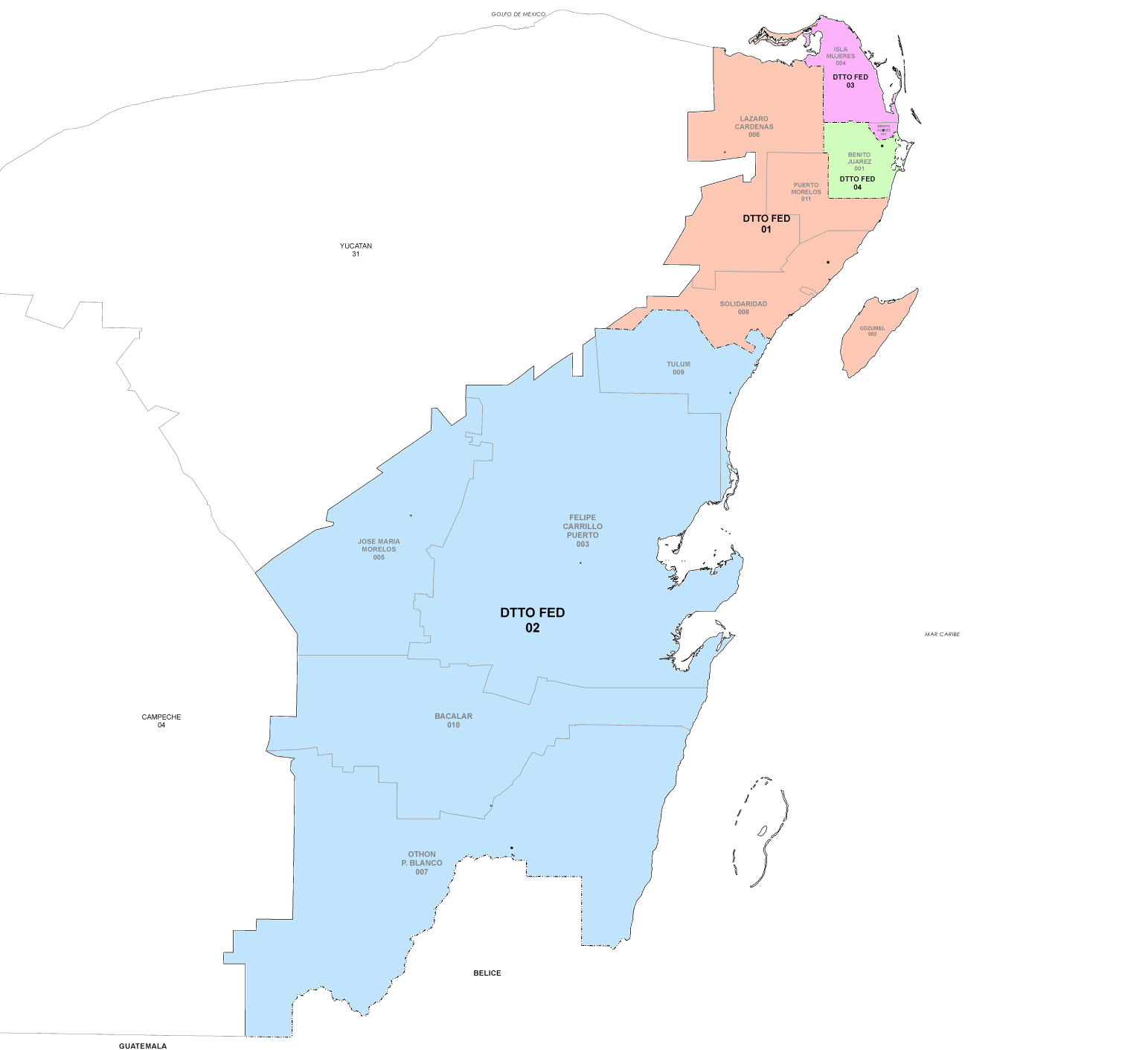
- 4th district since 2023

Incumbent
- Member: Mildred Ávila Vera
- Party: ▌Morena
- Congress: 66th (2024–2027)

District
- State: Quintana Roo
- Head town: Cancún
- Coordinates: 21°09′N 86°50′W
- Covers: Benito Juárez (part)
- PR region: Third
- Precincts: 200
- Population: 461,788 (2020 census)

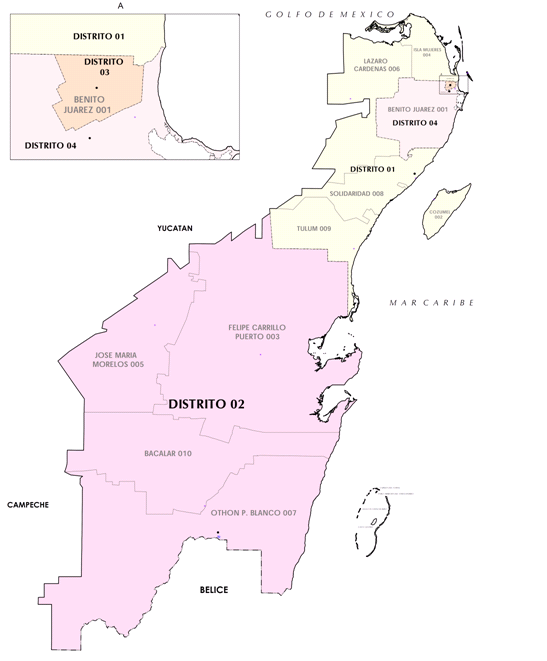
Quintana Roo under the 2017–2022 plan

The 4th federal electoral district of Quintana Roo (Spanish: Distrito electoral federal 04 de Quintana Roo) is one of the 300 electoral districts into which Mexico is divided for elections to the federal Chamber of Deputies and one of four such districts in the state of Quintana Roo.

It elects one deputy to the lower house of Congress for each three-year legislative session by means of the first-past-the-post system. Votes cast in the district also count towards the calculation of proportional representation ("plurinominal") deputies elected from the third region.

The 4th district was created as part of the 2017 redistricting process and was first contested in the 2018 general election.

The current member for the district, elected in the 2024 general election, is Mildred Ávila Vera of the National Regeneration Movement (Morena).

== District territory ==
Under the 2023 districting plan adopted by the National Electoral Institute (INE), which is to be used for the 2024, 2027 and 2030 federal elections, the 4th district covers 200 precincts (secciones electorales) in the municipality of Benito Juárez.

The head town (cabecera distrital), where results from individual polling stations are gathered together and tallied, is the city of Cancún, the municipal seat of Benito Juárez. The district reported a population of 461,788 in the 2020 census.

== Previous districting schemes ==
Evolution of electoral district numbers
| | 1973 | 1974 | 1978 | 1996 | 2005 | 2017 | 2023 |
|---|---|---|---|---|---|---|---|
| Quintana Roo | 1 | 2 | 2 | 2 | 3 | 4 | 4 |
| Chamber of Deputies | 194 | 196 | 300 | | | | |

2017–2022

The 4th district was created by the 2017 redistricting process. From 2017 to 2022, the district had its head town at Cancún and it comprised 210 precincts in the municipality of Benito Juárez.

== Deputies returned to Congress ==
(Mexico) National parties
- Current
- PAN
- PRI
- PT
- PVEM
- MC
- Morena
- PAZ
- Somos
- Defunct or local only
- PLM
- PNR
- PRM
- PNM
- PP
- PPS
- PARM
- PFCRN
- CON
- PANAL
- PSD
- PES
- PES
- PRD

Quintana Roo's 4th district
| Election | Deputy | Party | Term | Legislature |
|---|---|---|---|---|
| 2018 | Jesús Pool Moo (Note: Originally sat for Morena; declared himself independent on 1 July 2020; joined the PRD benches on 28 July 2020; switched to the PRI on 31 August 2020; later returned to the PRD.) | National Regeneration Movement Independent politician Party of the Democratic Revolution Institutional Revolutionary Party | 2018–2021 | 64th Congress |
| 2021 | Laura Fernández Piña (Note: Elected for the PVEM, switched to the PRD in 2022 for an unsuccessful gubernatorial run, declared herself independent on 1 February 2024.) | Ecologist Green Party of Mexico Party of the Democratic Revolution Independent politician | 2021–2024 | 65th Congress |
| 2024 | Mildred Ávila Vera | National Regeneration Movement | 2024–2027 | 66th Congress |

== Presidential elections ==
Quintana Roo's 4th district
| Election | District won by | Party or coalition | % |
|---|---|---|---|
| 2018 | Andrés Manuel López Obrador | Juntos Haremos Historia | 63.3892 |
| 2024 | Claudia Sheinbaum Pardo | Sigamos Haciendo Historia | 65.3404 |
