= Félix González Canto =

Mexican politician and economist

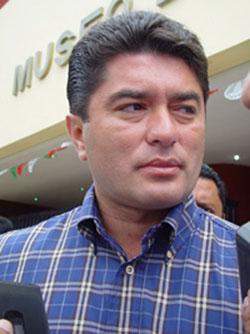

6th Governor of Quintana Roo
- In office 5 April 2005 – 4 April 2011
- Preceded by: Joaquín Hendricks Díaz
- Succeeded by: Roberto Borge Angulo

Member of the Chamber of Deputies for Quintana Roo's 1st district
- In office 1 September 2003 – 5 November 2004
- Preceded by: Alicia Ricalde Magaña
- Succeeded by: María Concepción Fajardo

Personal details
- Born: 23 August 1968 (age 57) Cozumel, Quintana Roo
- Party: Institutional Revolutionary Party
- Spouse: Narcedalia Martín Villanueva
- Profession: Economist; Politician

Félix Arturo González Canto (born 23 August 1968) is a Mexican politician and economist, affiliated with the Institutional Revolutionary Party (PRI). From 2005 until 2011 he was the governor of the state of Quintana Roo.

He has previously held the positions of mayor (Presidente Municipal) of his home town of Cozumel (1999–2002) and has served as a deputy in the Federal Congress (2003–2005, representing Quintana Roo's First District). During 2004 he also served as a representative of Mexico to the Central American Parliament.

Preceded by Joaquín Ernesto Hendricks Díaz	Governor of Quintana Roo; 2005–2011	Succeeded by Roberto Borge Angulo
