= Governor of Quintana Roo =

Chief executive of the Mexican state of Quintana Roo

- Incumbent; Mara Lezama Espinosa since 25 September 2022
- Term length: Six years, non-renewable.
- Inaugural holder: Jesús Martínez Ross
- Formation: 5 April 1975
- Website: Government of Quintana Roo (in Spanish)

The governors of the Mexican state of Quintana Roo, since statehood.

== Governors of the Free and Sovereign State of Quintana Roo since 1975 ==
Governors of Quintana Roo
No.	Governor	Term in office	Party	Election
1	Jesús Martínez Ross (1934–2025)	5 April 1975 – 4 April 1981	PRI	1975
2	Pedro Joaquín Coldwell (b. 1950)	5 April 1981 – 4 April 1987	PRI	1981
3	Miguel Borge Martín (b. 1943)	5 April 1987 – 4 April 1993	PRI	1987
4	Mario Villanueva Madrid (b. 1948)	5 April 1993 – 4 April 1999	PRI	1993
5	Joaquín Hendricks Díaz (b. 1951)	5 April 1999 – 4 April 2005	PRI	1999
6	Félix González Canto (b. 1968)	5 April 2005 – 4 April 2011	PRI	2005
7	Roberto Borge Angulo (b. 1979)	5 April 2011 – 25 September 2016	PRI	2010
8	Carlos Joaquín González (b. 1965)	25 September 2016 – 25 September 2022	PRD	2016
9	Mara Lezama Espinosa (b. 1968)	25 September 2022 – Incumbent	Morena	2022

- Note: In 2001 Mario E. Villanueva was sentenced to prison due to corruption involving Mexican drug war during his time as governor, the length of his sentence has been extended multiple times as more of his past crimes emerged after his capture.
- Note: On 5 June 2017; Roberto Borge was sentenced to prison due to corruption involving during his time as governor. He was the third ex-governor from the PRI, to be sentenced in 2017 following the captures of Tomas Yarrington (Tamaulipas) and Javier Duarte (Veracruz).

== Pre-statehood ==
=== Political Chiefs of the Federal Territory of Quintana Roo ===
- 1902 – 1903: José María de la Vega
- 1903 – 1911: Ignacio A. Bravo
- 1911 – 1912: Manuel Sánchez Rivera
- 1912: Rafael Egealiz
- 1912 – 1913: Alfredo Cámara Vales
- 1913: Isidro Escobar Garrido
- 1913: Alfonso Carrera Carbó
- 1913: Víctor M. Morón
- 1913: Arturo Garcilazo Juárez
- 1913 – 1915: Annexed to Yucatán
- 1915 – 1916: Carlos Plank
- 1916 – 1917: Carlos A. Vidal

=== Governors of the Federal Territory of Quintana Roo ===
- 1917 – 1918: Carlos A. Vidal
- 1918 – 1921: Octaviano Solís Aguirre
- 1921: Pascual Coral Heredia
- 1921 – 1923: Librado Abitia
- 1923: Camilo E. Félix
- 1923 – 1924: Anastasio Rojas
- 1924: Librado Abitia
- 1924 – 1925: Enrique Barocio Barrios
- 1925: Amado Aguirre Santiago
- 1925: Enrique Barocio Barrios
- 1925 – 1926: Candelario Garza
- 1926: Malrubio de la Chapa
- 1926 – 1927: Antonio Ancona Albertos
- 1927 – 1930: José Siurob
- 1930 – 1931: Arturo Campillo Seyde
- 1931: J. Félix Bañuelos
- 1931 – 1935: Annexed to Yucatán and Campeche
- 1935 – 1940: Rafael E. Melgar
- 1940 – 1944: Gabriel R. Guevara
- 1944 – 1959: Margarito Ramírez
- 1959 – 1964: Aarón Merino Fernández
- 1965 – 1967: Rufo Figueroa Figueroa
- 1967 – 1970: Javier Rojo Gómez
- 1971 – 1974: David Gustavo Gutiérrez

== See also ==
- List of Mexican state governors
- Territory of Quintana Roo
- List of governors of dependent territories in the 20th century
