= Joaquín Hendricks Díaz =

Mexican politician

Joaquín Hendricks
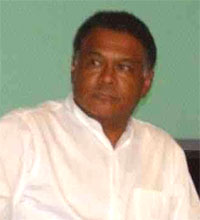

5th Governor of Quintana Roo
- In office 5 April 1999 – 4 April 2005
- Preceded by: Mario Villanueva Madrid
- Succeeded by: Félix González Canto

Member of the Chamber of Deputies for Quintana Roo's 1st district
- In office 1 November 1991 – 31 October 1994
- Preceded by: Elina Elfi Coral Castilla
- Succeeded by: Sara Muza Simón

Personal details
- Born: 7 November 1951 (age 74) Chetumal, Quintana Roo
- Party: Institutional Revolutionary Party
- Spouse: María Rubio
- Profession: Lieutenant colonel Politician

Joaquín Ernesto Hendricks Díaz (born 7 November 1951 in Chetumal, Quintana Roo) is a Mexican politician belonging to the Partido Revolucionario Institucional. From 1991 to 1994, he held a seat in the Chamber of Deputies, representing Quintana Roo's First District. Between 1999 and 2005 he served as governor of the state of Quintana Roo.

Preceded by Mario Villanueva Madrid	Governor of Quintana Roo; 5 April 1999 to 4 April 2005	Succeeded by Félix González Canto
