= List of radio stations in Quintana Roo =

This is a list of CRT-licensed radio stations in the Mexican state of Quintana Roo, which can be sorted by their call signs, frequencies, location, ownership, names, and programming formats.

Radio stations in Quintana Roo
Call sign	Frequency	Location	Owner	Name	Format
XEYI-AM (Note: Combo with XHYI-FM 93.1)	580 AM	Cancún	Radio XHYI, S. de R.L. de C.V.	Mix	English adult contemporary
XECPR-AM	660 AM	Felipe Carrillo Puerto	Government of the State of Quintana Roo	Radio Chan Santa Cruz	Public radio
XECAQ-AM (Note: Combo with XHCAQ-FM 92.3)	740 AM	Puerto Morelos	Transmisora Regional Radio Fórmula, S.A. de C.V.	Radio Fórmula	News/talk
XERB-AM (Note: Combo with XHRB-FM 89.9)	810 AM	Cozumel	Luis Alberto Pavia Mendoza	Sol Stereo	Regional Mexican
XECTL-AM	860 AM	Chetumal	Government of the State of Quintana Roo	Radio Chetumal	Public radio
XEWO-AM (Note: Combo with XHRB-FM 97.7)	1020 AM	Chetumal	Luis Alberto Pavia Mendoza	Sol Stereo	Regional Mexican
XEFEL-AM (Note: Paired with XHNKA-FM 104.5)	1030 AM	Felipe Carrillo Puerto	Instituto Nacional de los Pueblos Indígenas	La Voz del Gran Pueblo	Indigenous
XHANC-FM	88.1 FM	Cancún	Instituto Americano Leonardo da Vinci, S.C.	Radio Da Vinci	Cultural
XHYAM-FM	88.1 FM	José María Morelos	Sebastián Uc Yam	La Morelense	Variety
XHPMQ-FM	89.1 FM	Puerto Morelos	Fundación Cultural Maya Puerto Morelos, A.C.	Frecuencia Mágica	Variety
XHCCBP-FM	89.3 FM	José María Morelos	Ana Laura Vázquez Alfaro	Boom FM	Regional Mexican
XHLAR-FM	89.7 FM	Bacalar	Filantropía y Altruismo, A.C.	Bacalar FM 89.7	Variety
XHRB-FM	89.9 FM	Cozumel	Luis Alberto Pavia Mendoza	Sol Stereo	Regional Mexican
XHCCBO-FM	89.9 FM	Tihosuco, Felipe Carrillo Puerto	Ana Laura Vázquez Alfaro	Boom FM	Regional Mexican
XHCCE-FM	90.5 FM	Chetumal	Culturalmente Chetumal, A.C.	—N/a	—N/a
XHQOO-FM	90.7 FM	Cancún	GIM Televisión Nacional, S.A. de C.V.	Imagen Radio	News/talk
XHPCHQ-FM	91.3 FM	Chetumal	Empresa Turquesa, S.A. de C.V.	Haahil FM	Regional Mexican
XHCCQ-FM	91.5 FM	Cancún	XECCQ-AM, S.A. de C.V.	La Bestia Grupera	Regional Mexican
XHCCBQ-FM	92.1 FM	Chetumal	Radio Cañón, S.A. de C.V.	W Radio	News/talk
XHCAQ-FM	92.3 FM	Cancún	Transmisora Regional Radio Fórmula, S.A. de C.V.	Radio Fórmula	News/talk
XHPJOS-FM	92.5 FM	José María Morelos	Empresa Turquesa, S.A. de C.V.	Radio Turquesa	Regional Mexican
XHCCBR-FM	92.9 FM	Chetumal	La Mera en Playa, S.A. de C.V.	La Z	Regional Mexican
XHYI-FM	93.1 FM	Cancún	Radio XHYI, S. de R.L. de C.V.	Mix	English adult contemporary
XHPJMM-FM	93.3 FM	José María Morelos	Corpulenta Operadora, S.A. de C.V.	Presumida	Contemporary hit radio
XHPNIC-FM	93.3 FM	Nicolás Bravo	Empresa Turquesa, S.A. de C.V.	Radio Turquesa	Regional Mexican
XHPHOL-FM	93.5 FM	Holbox	Mario Óscar Beteta Vallejo	—N/a	—N/a
XHCPCO-FM	93.7 FM	Chetumal	Instituto Mexicano de la Radio	—N/a	—N/a
XHCCBS-FM	94.1 FM	Mahahual	Gardom Media Group, S.A. de C.V.	—N/a	—N/a
XHPTUL-FM	94.7 FM	Tulum	Mas Radio Telecomunicaciones, S.A. de C.V.	Origen Radio	Variety
XHPBCQ-FM	94.9 FM	Cancún	Promotora de Éxitos, S.A. de C.V.	La Z	Regional Mexican
XHPFCP-FM	95.1 FM	Felipe Carrillo Puerto	Pantalla Líquida, S.A. de C.V.	La Mejor	Regional Mexican
XHROO-FM	95.3 FM	Chetumal	Radio Cancún, S.A. de C.V.	Kiss 95.3 FM	Contemporary hit radio
XHCCBU-FM	95.5 FM	Tulum	Radio Cañón, S.A. de C.V.	La Ke Buena	Regional Mexican
XHCCBM-FM	95.7 FM	Cancún	Radio Cañón, S.A. de C.V.	—N/a	—N/a
XHPMAQ-FM	95.7 FM	Mahahual	Pantalla Líquida, S.A. de C.V.	—N/a	—N/a
XHPPLY-FM	96.1 FM	Playa del Carmen	AGC Radio Sureste, S.A. de C.V.	Grupo Cartón Radio	Pop
XHCCBN-FM	96.5 FM	Cancún	La Mera en Playa, S.A. de C.V.	Hits 96.5	Contemporary hit radio
XHPCPQ-FM	96.7 FM	Felipe Carrillo Puerto	Empresa Turquesa, S.A. de C.V.	Radio Turquesa	Regional Mexican
XHPMAH-FM	97.3 FM	Mahahual	Corpulenta Operadora, S.A. de C.V.	—N/a	—N/a
XHWO-FM	97.7 FM	Chetumal	Luis Alberto Pavia Mendoza	Sol Stereo	Regional Mexican
XHCCBT-FM	98.1 FM	Nicolás Bravo	Grupo BD Cast, S.A. de C.V.	—N/a	—N/a
XHCTQ-FM	98.5 FM	Chetumal	Blanca Chan Castro	Radio Frontera	
XHCQR-FM	99.3 FM	Cancún	Gaia FM, A.C.	Lokura FM Rock	Adult hits
XHQAA-FM	99.3 FM	Chetumal	XEQAA-AM, S.A. de C.V.	La Bestia Grupera	Regional Mexican
XHPTOM-FM	100.3 FM	Puerto Morelos	AGC Radio Sureste 2, S.A. de C.V.	Grupo Cartón Radio	Pop
XHRTO-FM	100.5 FM	Felipe Carrillo Puerto	Sebastián Uc Yam	La Estrella Maya Que Habla	Variety
XHROOC-FM	101.7 FM	Chetumal	La Voz de Quintana Roo, S.A. de C.V.	La Guadalupana	Regional Mexican
XHCBJ-FM	101.9 FM	Cancún	Government of the State of Quintana Roo	Caribe FM	Public radio
XHECPQ-FM	102.1 FM	Felipe Carrillo Puerto	Sebastián Uc Yam	La Líder	Regional Mexican
XHCANQ-FM	102.7 FM	Santa Martha, Cancún	Gastón Alegre López	Turquesa Pop	Contemporary hit radio
XHACS-FM	103.1 FM	Playa del Carmen	Arte y Cultura por Solidaridad, A.C.	Playa FM	Cultural
XHMAL-FM	103.3 FM	Chetumal	La Verdad Radio y TV, A.C.	—N/a	—N/a
XHROJ-FM	103.5 FM	Cancún	Fundación Maya Cancún, A.C.	Maya FM	Contemporary hit radio
XHZCM-FM	103.9 FM	Cozumel	Patronato Pro-Televisión de Cozumel, A.C.	La Voz del Caribe	Variety
XHNKA-FM	104.5 FM	Felipe Carrillo Puerto	Instituto Nacional de los Pueblos Indígenas	La Voz del Gran Pueblo	Indigenous
XHICT-FM	104.7 FM	Tulum	Identidad Cultural en Tulum, A.C.	Tulum FM	Cultural
XHNUC-FM	105.1 FM	Cancún	Televisión y Radio Caribe, A.C.	Radio Turquesa	Regional Mexican
XHAKUM-FM	105.5 FM	Akumal	Enlace Social Akumal, A.C.	Origen Radio	Variety
XHCUN-FM	105.9 FM	Cancún	Presidencia Municipal de Cancún	RCA 105.9 FM	Public radio
XHLAYA-FM	106.3 FM	Playa del Carmen	Gaia FM, A.C.	Lokura FM Rock	Adult hits
XHCAN-FM	107.5 FM	Cancún	Roberto Martínez Vara y López Portillo	Máxima	Contemporary hit radio
