= 95.1 FM =

FM radio frequency

The following radio stations broadcast on FM frequency 95.1 MHz:

== Argentina ==
- LRM945 Esperanza in Venado Tuerto, Santa Fe
- LRP756 Estilo in San Justo, Santa Fe
- Metro 95.1 in Buenos Aires
- KISS FM in Rosario, Santa Fe
- Estacion Isla Verde in Isla Verde, Córdoba
- Radio María in Belén, Catamarca
- Radio María in San Carlos de Bariloche, Río Negro

== Australia ==
- 2MIA in Griffith, New South Wales
- 2PNN in Port Stephens, New South Wales
- 4ROM in Roma, Queensland
- 4RGK in Gladstone, Queensland
- 3PNN in Latrobe Valley, Victoria

== Belize ==
- LOVE FM

== Canada (Channel 236) ==
- CBDU-FM in Lynn Lake, Manitoba
- CBF-FM in Montreal, Quebec
- CBF-FM-16 in Clova, Quebec
- CBN-FM-4 in Stephenville, Newfoundland and Labrador
- CBON-FM-17 in North Bay, Ontario
- CFAH-FM in Moberly, British Columbia
- CFCY-FM in Charlottetown, Prince Edward Island
- CFMC-FM in Saskatoon, Saskatchewan
- CHBR-FM in Shalalth, British Columbia
- CHRX-FM-1 in Dawson Creek, British Columbia
- CHVN-FM in Winnipeg, Manitoba
- CILE-FM in Havre-St-Pierre, Quebec
- CIMB-FM in Betsiamites, Quebec
- CJAY-FM-1 in Banff, Alberta
- CJOA-FM in Thunder Bay, Ontario
- CJRP-FM-1 in Rothesay, New Brunswick
- CJSG-FM in Campement Sarcelle, Quebec
- CKCB-FM in Collingwood, Ontario
- CKHJ-1-FM in New Maryland, New Brunswick
- CKMV-FM in Grand-Sault, New Brunswick
- CKUE-FM in Chatham, Ontario
- VF2169 in Smithers, British Columbia
- VF2217 in Mont-Wright, Quebec
- VF2229 in Topley Landing, British Columbia
- VF2230 in Cheslatta, British Columbia
- VF2476 in Fraser Lake, British Columbia
- VF2519 in Williams Lake, British Columbia

== China ==
- CNR The Voice of China in Mianyang
- Radio Zhuhai Zhuhai News Radio in Zhuhai

== Greece ==
- Cosmoradio in Thessaloniki
- Music Life in Agrinio
- ERA 1 in Thassos
- Cosmoradio Halkidiki in Halkidiki

== Indonesia ==
- Kis FM in Jakarta
- MNC Trijaya FM in Medan, North Sumatra
- Trax FM in Palembang, South Sumatra

== Ireland ==
- WLR-FM in County Waterford

== Malaysia ==
- Manis FM in Kuantan, Pahang

== Mexico ==
- XHAPM-FM in Apatzingán, Michoacán
- XHBC-FM in Ciudad Guzmán, Jalisco
- XHBCPZ-FM in La Paz, Baja California Sur
- XHBOC-FM in Bocoyna-San Juanito, Chihuahua
- XHEL-FM in Fresnillo, Zacatecas
- XHFJ-FM in Teziutlán, Puebla
- XHJRS-FM in Jalpa, Zacatecas
- XHLX-FM in Zitácuaro, Michoacán
- XHMAI-FM in Mapastepec, Chiapas
- XHNH-FM in Irapuato, Guanajuato
- XHPFCP-FM in Felipe Carrillo Puerto, Quintana Roo
- XHSQB-FM in San Quintín, Baja California

== Paraguay ==
- ZPV1 at Asunción

== Philippines ==
- DWRW in San Fernando City, Pampanga
- DXPS in Cotabato City
- DWMB in Baguio City
- DWKI in Lucena City
- DYQS in Puerto Princesa City
- DWQJ in Naga City
- XFM in Kabankalan City
- DYIC-FM in Iloilo City
- DYSR in Dumaguete City
- DXMB-FM in Butuan City
- DYTX in Tacloban City
- DXZD in Iligan City
- DXKS-FM in Tagum City

== Trinidad and Tobago ==
- 95 The Ultimate One, broadcasts from Port of Spain, Trinidad and Tobago and available Nationwide.

== United Kingdom ==
- BBC Radio Manchester

== United States (Channel 236) ==
- KABQ-FM in Corrales, New Mexico
- KABW in Baird, Texas
- KALH-LP in Alamogordo, New Mexico
- KAMS in Mammoth Spring, Arkansas
- KAOI in Wailuku, Hawaii
- KATC in Colorado Springs, Colorado
- KBBY in Ventura, California
- KBVB in Barnesville, Minnesota
- KCGY in Laramie, Wyoming
- KCJL-LP in Dodge Center, Minnesota
- KCXM-LP in Kimberling City, Missouri
- KCZE in New Hampton, Iowa
- KEPP-LP in Epps, Louisiana
- KEWL in New Boston, Texas
- KFOK-LP in Georgetown, California
- KFRG in San Bernardino, California
- KGGV-LP in Guerneville, California
- KHMJ in Trona, California
- KHOP in Oakdale, California
- KICT in Wichita, Kansas
- KISN-LP in Portland, Oregon
- KITI in Winlock, Washington
- KKGT in Jacksonville, Texas
- KKNN in Delta, Colorado
- KMAQ in Maquoketa, Iowa
- KMDR in McKinleyville, California
- KMLY in Gonzales, California
- KMXI in Chico, California
- KMXL in Carthage, Missouri
- KMYB-LP in Killeen, Texas
- KMYO in Comfort, Texas
- KNDE in College Station, Texas
- KNEE in Nenana, Alaska
- KNUW in Santa Clara, New Mexico
- KNVC-LP in Carson City, Nevada
- KNYE in Pahrump, Nevada
- KOOW-LP in Central City, Nebraska
- KPGC-LP in Norman, Arkansas
- KQCV in Shawnee, Oklahoma
- KQRX in Midland, Texas
- KRBV-LP in Bunkerville, Nevada
- KRGX in Rio Grande City, Texas
- KRHR in Odell, Oregon
- KRKR in Lincoln, Nebraska
- KSND in Monmouth, Oregon
- KSQY in Deadwood, South Dakota
- KTHC in Sidney, Montana
- KTKS in Versailles, Missouri
- KTTI in Yuma, Arizona
- KULA-LP in Ili'ili, American Samoa
- KUSQ in Worthington, Minnesota
- KVVT-LP in Sulphur Springs, Texas
- KWXZ-LP in Coachella, California
- KXEI in Havre, Montana
- KYCS in Rock Springs, Wyoming
- KYKR in Beaumont, Texas
- KZAS-LP in Hood River, Oregon
- KZON in Sun City West, Arizona
- WAIO in Honeoye Falls, New York
- WAJI in Fort Wayne, Indiana
- WAPE in Jacksonville, Florida
- WAST-LP at Coventry, Rhode Island
- WAYV in Atlantic City, New Jersey
- WBPC in Ebro, Florida
- WCDZ in Dresden, Tennessee
- WDZQ in Decatur, Illinois
- WEGM in San German, Puerto Rico
- WEVX-LP in Londonderry, New Hampshire
- WFAV in Kankakee, Illinois
- WFBE in Flint, Michigan
- WFKS in Melbourne, Florida
- WFLE in Flemingsburg, Kentucky
- WFNH-LP in Jackson, Mississippi
- WGAC-FM in Harlem, Georgia
- WGGC in Bowling Green, Kentucky
- WIIL in Kenosha, Wisconsin
- WIKZ in Chambersburg, Pennsylvania
- WJHV-LP in Fairbury, Illinois
- WJKC in Christiansted, Virgin Islands
- WJRB in Young Harris, Georgia
- WJXM (FM) in Marion, Mississippi
- WLEE-FM in Sherman, Mississippi
- WLPZ-LP in Leominster, Massachusetts
- WLST in Marinette, Wisconsin
- WMGB in Montezuma, Georgia
- WNLV in Charlotte, North Carolina
- WNLW-LP in Williamsburg, Kentucky
- WONA-FM in Vaiden, Mississippi
- WPLC-LP in Piqua, Ohio
- WQMZ in Charlottesville, Virginia
- WQNZ in Natchez, Mississippi
- WQRB in Bloomer, Wisconsin
- WRBS in Baltimore, Maryland
- WRKI in Brookfield, Connecticut
- WRNS in Kinston, North Carolina
- WRTT in Huntsville, Alabama
- WSGX-LP in East Baton Rouge, Louisiana
- WSSX in Charleston, South Carolina
- WSVB-LP in Chiefland, Florida
- WSYP-LP in Birmingham, Alabama
- WUEZ in Carterville, Illinois
- WUPN (FM) in Paradise, Michigan
- WVDL-LP in New Orleans, Louisiana
- WVNI in Nashville, Indiana
- WVTQ in Sunderland, Vermont
- WVUR in Valparaiso, Indiana
- WVXG in Mount Gilead, Ohio
- WWZB-LP in Manchester, Kentucky
- WXFX in Prattville, Alabama
- WXIL in Elizabeth, West Virginia
- WXRB in Dudley, Massachusetts
- WXTK in West Yarmouth, Massachusetts
- WYLE in Grove City, Pennsylvania
- WZZO in Bethlehem, Pennsylvania

== Vietnam ==
- Ninh Binh Radio in Ninh Binh Province
