= KBOE =

KBOE may refer to:

- KBOE-FM, a radio station (104.9 FM) licensed to Oskaloosa, Iowa, United States
- KMZN, a radio station (740 AM) licensed to Oskaloosa, Iowa, which held the call sign KBOE from 1950 to 2014
- Kilo barrel of oil equivalent (kBOE), a commonly used multiple of the barrel of oil equivalent (BOE)
