= List of television stations in Quintana Roo =

The following is a list of all CRT-licensed over-the-air television stations broadcasting in the Mexican state of Quintana Roo.

== List of television stations ==
RF	VC	Call sign	Location	Network/name	ERP	Concessionaire
28	1	XHCCQ-TDT	Cancún; Playa del Carmen	Azteca Uno (adn40)	38.74 kW; 52.97 kW	Televisión Azteca
21	2	XHCCN-TDT	Cancún; Playa del Carmen	Las Estrellas	60 kW; 20 kW	Televimex
22	3	XHCTCN-TDT	Cancún	Imagen Televisión (Excélsior TV)	60 kW	Cadena Tres I, S.A. de C.V.
34	4	XHNQR-TDT	Cancún	SQCS	59.59 kW	Sistema Quintanarroense de Comunicación Social
27	5/9	XHQRO-TDT	Cancún; Playa del Carmen	Canal 5 (Nu9ve)	60 kW; 20 kW	Radio Televisión
25	7	XHAQR-TDT	Cancún; Playa del Carmen	Azteca 7 (a+)	38.97 kW; 53.08 kW	Televisión Azteca
36	8	XHCCU-TDT	Cancún; Playa del Carmen	SIPSE TVCUN (6.1 Multimedios Televisión)	86.24 kW; 20 kW	Televisora de Cancún (Grupo SIPSE)
17	11	XHPBCN-TDT	Cancún	Canal Once	109.53 kW	Instituto Politécnico Nacional
32	13	XHTMQR-TDT	Cancún	Telsusa (Canal 13)	80.610 kW	Telsusa Televisión México
29		XHSPQ-TDT	Cancún			Sistema Público de Radiodifusión del Estado Mexicano
23	1	XHBX-TDT	Chetumal	Azteca Uno (adn40)	8.54 kW	Televisión Azteca
27	2	XHCHF-TDT	Chetumal	Las Estrellas	28 kW	Televimex
22	3	XHCTCL-TDT	Chetumal	Imagen Televisión	10 kW	Cadena Tres I, S.A. de C.V.
34	4	XHLQR-TDT	Chetumal	SQCS	67.4 kW	Sistema Quintanarroense de Comunicación Social
29	5/9	XHCQR-TDT	Chetumal	Canal 5 (Nu9ve)	28 kW	Radio Televisión
26	7	XHCQO-TDT	Chetumal	Azteca 7 (a+)	8.52 kW	Televisión Azteca
20	13	XHTMCH-TDT	Chetumal	Telsusa (Canal 13)	80 kW	Telsusa Televisión México
25		XHSPJ-TDT	Chetumal			Sistema Público de Radiodifusión del Estado Mexicano
30	2	XHCOQ-TDT	Cozumel	Las Estrellas (5.1 Canal 5, 9.1 Nu9ve)	165 kW	Televimex
23	11	XHCOZ-TDT	Cozumel	5tv Cozumel	0.15 kW	Patronato Pro-Televisión de Cozumel
25	1/7	XHPVC-TDT	Felipe Carrillo Puerto	Azteca Uno (Azteca 7)	3.6 kW	Televisión Azteca
32	3	XHCTFC-TDT	Felipe Carrillo Puerto	Imagen Televisión		Cadena Tres I, S.A. de C.V.
28	4	XHFCQ-TDT	Felipe Carrillo Puerto	SQCS	0.1 kW	Sistema Quintanarroense de Comunicación Social (Gobierno del Estado de Quintana Roo)
33	3	XHCTMT-TDT	José María Morelos	Imagen Televisión		Cadena Tres I, S.A. de C.V.
19	13	XHTMTU-TDT	Tulum/Playa del Carmen	Telsusa (Canal 13)	80 kW	Telsusa Televisión México
