= XHLAYA-FM =

Radio station in Playa del Carmen, Quintana Roo

- Playa del Carmen, Quintana Roo; Mexico
- Frequency: 106.3 MHz
- Branding: Lokura FM Rock

Programming
- Format: Classic rock

Ownership
- Owner: CapitalMedia (Gaia FM, A.C.)

History
- First air date: 2012
- Call sign meaning: From "playa"

Technical information
- Licensing authority: CRT
- Class: A
- ERP: 3 kW
- HAAT: 79.679 m
- Transmitter coordinates: 20°39′28.51″N 87°08′04.15″W

Links
- Website: lokura.fm

XHLAYA-FM is a noncommercial radio station in Playa del Carmen, Quintana Roo, Mexico. Broadcasting on 106.3 FM, XHLAYA is owned by Gaia FM, A.C., and known as Lokura FM Rock.

== History ==
Capital Pirata logo used from 2015 to 2018

The permit for XHLAYA was awarded on January 11, 2012, to Gaia FM, A.C., along with additional permits for stations in Colima, Colima (XHOMA-FM), Puerto Vallarta (XHGAI-FM) and Cancún (XHCQR-FM).

In 2015, Gaia FM, A.C. was subsumed into CapitalMedia, which is a commercial radio station owner. The stations kept their format with a name change to Capital Pirata FM. In a 2018 filing with the IFT, Capital declared that it did not directly operate the Gaia FM stations but instead provided them with less than five percent of their broadcast day in news capsules and other material.

Like most Capital stations, XHLAYA adopted the new Lokura FM adult hits format in 2020. When the Lokura brand was split in 2024, this station and XHCQR-FM became Lokura FM Rock stations with English-language classic rock formats.
