= Puerto Arturo, Quintana Roo =

Town in Quintana Roo

Puerto Arturo
- Location within Quintana Roo Location within Mexico
- Coordinates: 19.6583°N 89.0667°W
- Country: Mexico
- State: Quintana Roo

Population (2020)
  - Total: 716
- Time zone: UTC-5 (Zona Sureste)
- Climate: Aw

Puerto Arturo is a town in the municipality of José María Morelos in the Mexican state of Quintana Roo. According to the 2020 Census, Puerto Arturo has a population of 716.

== History ==
Puerto Arturo was established in 1956 and initially developed as a center for chicle extraction, reflecting the region’s early economic reliance on forest-based activities. Over time, the community transitioned toward agriculture, which gradually became its primary economic foundation.

The community’s name honors Arturo Puerto, an early explorer of the area who sought water sources and natural resources during a period of regional settlement. Arturo Puerto died from malaria during these expeditions. In recognition of his efforts, Don Luis Mesa, founder of the local ejido, designated the settlement as “Puerto Arturo.” Historical accounts indicate that the original name, “Arturo Puerto,” was later reversed to form the current name.

In 2025, a health center was founded to serve the residents of Puerto Arturo and the surrounding communities.

== Economy ==
Agriculture remains the principal economic activity of Puerto Arturo. Crops such as corn, limes, and watermelon are cultivated year-round, supporting both subsistence needs and commercial distribution beyond the community. These agricultural activities contribute significantly to local income and economic stability.
