= XHPFCP-FM =

- Felipe Carrillo Puerto, Quintana Roo; Mexico
- Frequency: 95.1 FM (HD Radio)
- Branding: La Mejor

Programming
- Format: Regional Mexican
- Affiliations: MVS Radio

Ownership
- Owner: Pantalla Líquida, S.A. de C.V.

History
- First air date: 2020
- Call sign meaning: Felipe Carrillo Puerto

Technical information
- Licensing authority: CRT
- Class: AA
- ERP: 5 kW
- HAAT: 68 meters
- Transmitter coordinates: 19°34′25.26″N 88°2′29.23″W

Links
- Webcast: Listen live
- Website: lamejor.com.mx

XHPFCP-FM is a radio station on 95.1 FM in Felipe Carrillo Puerto, Quintana Roo, Mexico. It is owned by Pantalla Líquida, S.A. de C.V and carries the La Mejor Regional Mexican format from MVS Radio.

== History ==
XHPFCP was awarded in the IFT-4 radio auction of 2017; owner Pantalla Líquida, controlled by the same family as Cozumel social radio and TV stations XHZCM-FM and XHCOZ-TDT, paid 3.24 million pesos.

Originally known as "95.1, La Voz de Carrillo Puerto", the station picked up the La Mejor franchise from MVS Radio in July 2022.
