= Baktun (TV series) =

2013 Mayan telenovela

- Country of origin: Mexico
- Original language: Maya
- No. of episodes: 21

Production
- Production location: Tihosuco

Original release
- Release: August 2013

Baktun is a telenovela in Maya broadcast on Quintana Roo public television in August 2013. A bʼakʼtun is a megacycle of the Maya calendar.

== Production ==
Produced for $250,000 by Bruno Cárcamo, a veteran Mexican producer, the 21 episodes were filmed in Tihosuco, an historic town in northern Quintana Roo; it will also be distributed as a film. The film uses many previously inexperienced actors and extras from the local community. Hilario Chi Canul, an expert in Mayan language and culture, helped translate the script into Maya and also plays the male lead.

== Plot ==
The male love interest returns home from New York City where he has been working; he has nearly forgotten his native language. The film conforms to Mayan cultural norms; it does not contain explicit love scenes.

The telenovela has been presented at the National Museum of Anthropology in Mexico City.
