= WPEO-FM =

Simulcast of WPEO (1020 AM)
- Farmer City, Illinois; United States
- Broadcast area: Champaign, Bloomington
- Frequency: 98.3 MHz
- Branding: The Word

Programming
- Format: Christian talk and teaching

Ownership
- Owner: WPEO Radio Foundation

History
- First air date: 1983; 43 years ago (as WZRO)
- Former call signs: WEZO (1983–1996); WWHP (1996–2018); WEXG (2018–2020)

Technical information
- Licensing authority: FCC
- Facility ID: 14962
- Class: A
- ERP: 5,200 watts
- HAAT: 107 meters (351 ft)
- Transmitter coordinates: 40°24′17.00″N 88°35′34.00″W
- Repeater: WPEO 1020 AM Peoria

Links
- Public license information: Public file; LMS
- Webcast: Listen Live
- Website: www.wpeo.com

WPEO-FM (98.3 MHz) is an FM radio station licensed to Farmer City, Illinois. It is owned by WPEO Radio Foundation, and it simulcasts a Christian talk and teaching radio format with co-owned WPEO 1020 AM in Peoria, Illinois. The radio studios and offices are just south of Illinois Central College in East Peoria, Illinois.

WPEO-FM has an effective radiated power (ERP) of 5,200 watts. The transmitter is in Saybrook, Illinois, giving it coverage of an area of Central Illinois between Champaign and Bloomington.

== History ==
The station began operations in 1983 as WZRO "5 County Country", then changed to WEZO, and changed to WWHP as "The Whip". It played a variety of music genres, primarily Americana roots, classic country, blues, and bluegrass. The station claimed to be located, "somewhere between Memphis and Chicago."

After a change in ownership in early 2014, the station changed formats to classic hits.

On November 23, 2015, WWHP became "NewsTalk 98.3" with a local morning and afternoon drive.

Former Cities 92.9 morning host Ian Bayne took over the station as program director and general manager and hosted the morning show from 6-9 am, installing national Breitbart editor Mike Flynn from 3-6 pm. Other programming included Laura Ingraham, Dana Loesch, Jerry Doyle, and Lars Larson.

On May 30, 2016, WWHP changed its format to classic rock.

On January 24, 2018, the station changed its call sign to WEXG and rebranded as "The Edge".

On October 6, 2020, WEXG changed its format from classic rock to a simulcast of Christian radio-formatted WPEO 1020 AM Peoria, branded as "The Word", and adopted a new WPEO-FM call sign the next day. Smash Hit then sold the station to WPEO owners WPEO Radio Foundation for $159,900. The sale was consummated on March 16, 2021.
