= Bernie Swain =

American businessman and author

- Born: May 4, 1945 (age 81); Riverdale, Maryland
- Education: Bachelor of Science, Master of Education
- Alma mater: George Washington University
- Occupations: Businessman, Author
- Spouse: Paula Swain
- Children: Timothy (1979), Michael (1982), Kelley (1983)
- Writing career
- Notable work: What Made Me Who I Am (2016)

Bernie Swain is an American businessman and author. He is the co-founder with Paula Swain and Harry Rhoads Jr. of Washington Speakers Bureau, a lecture agency which represents many prestigious authors, politicians, journalists, athletes, and business leaders.

== Early life and education ==
Bernie Swain was the first in his family to attend college. His mother and her family were farmers who grew up in central Virginia. His father, with six siblings, grew up in the poorest of mining towns in a West Virginia. When his grandmother could not always take care of his father, he spent part of his childhood in an orphanage. Inspired by a teacher, John C. Youngblood, Swain attended George Washington University earning a Bachelor of Science and a Master of Education.

== Professional life ==
After graduation, Swain worked as the assistant athletics director at George Washington. In 1980 he came across an article about the Harry Walker Agency, which was at the time the largest speakers bureau in the world. Swain's interest was piqued by founder Harry Walker's claim that he had no competitors.

Swain left his job to found the Washington Speakers Bureau with his wife Paula and friend Harry Rhoads. Business was slow the first year, in part because Walker's claim about a lack of competition in the speakers bureau business was false.

Washington Speakers Bureau signed its first client, Good Morning America anchor Steve Bell, on a handshake. Other journalists began to sign with the agency, attracted by the ability to work with them without signing a contract.

In 1989, former President Ronald Reagan selected Washington Speakers Bureau to represent him. More prestigious clients soon followed, including Margaret Thatcher, General Norman Schwarzkopf, and President George H. W. Bush.

== Publications ==
In 2016 Savio Hill published Swain's book What Made Me Who I Am, a collection of interviews with 34 successful leaders Swain met through Washington Speakers Bureau. The book explores the formative experiences and turning points in the lives of its subjects. People featured in the book include Tom Brokaw, Colin Powell, Terry Bradshaw, and Condoleezza Rice.

Swain published an article in the Harvard Business Review in September 2016, "Successful Leaders Know What Made Them Who They Are". He has been covered by The Washington Post, Fortune magazine, Entrepreneur magazine, WNYC's Brian Lehrer show, and more.
