= WPEO =

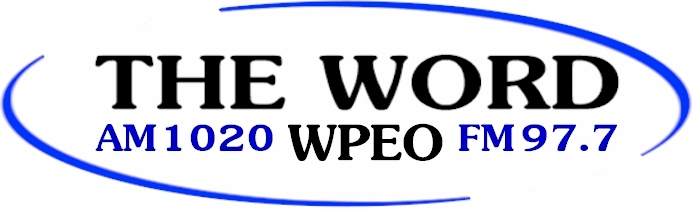

Peoria, Illinois; United States
- Broadcast area: Peoria metropolitan area
- Frequency: 1020 kHz
- Branding: The Word

Programming
- Format: Christian talk and teaching

Ownership
- Owner: WPEO Radio Foundation, Inc.

History
- First air date: 1946
- Former call signs: WMMJ (1946–1949)
- Call sign meaning: Peoria

Technical information
- Licensing authority: FCC
- Facility ID: 52641
- Class: D
- Power: 1,000 watts daytime-only
- Transmitter coordinates: 40°41′53.1″N 89°31′31.3″W (NAD83)
- Translators: 97.7 W249CZ (Peoria); 103.9 W280FA (Peoria)
- Repeaters: WPEO-FM (98.3 MHz, Farmer City)

Links
- Public license information: Public file; LMS
- Webcast: Listen Live
- Website: wpeo.com

WPEO (1020 kHz) is a daytime-only AM radio station licensed to Peoria, Illinois. It is owned by WPEO Radio Foundation, Inc., and it simulcasts a Christian talk and teaching radio format with co-owned WPEO-FM 98.3 FM in Farmer City, Illinois. The radio studios and offices are just south of Illinois Central College in East Peoria, Illinois.

By day, WPEO is powered at 1,000 watts non-directional. But because 1020 AM is a clear channel frequency reserved for Class A KDKA Pittsburgh, WPEO must sign off at sunset to avoid interference. The radio studio and transmitter are on Highview Road, just south of Illinois Central College in East Peoria, Illinois. Programming is heard around the clock on two FM translators: 97.7 W249CZ and 103.9 W280FA in Peoria, as well as 98.3 WPEO-FM in Farmer City.

== History ==
The station was first on the air from 1946 to 1949 as WMMJ, the second radio station in Peoria after 1470 WMBD. WMMJ played big band music and broadcast sports, but it had financial difficulties and went off the air.

WPEO signed on in August 1950, with its studios in the Jefferson Hotel downtown, and started its top 40 format in 1954, competing with 1290 WIRL. During this time, noted disc jockey Harry Harrison was at WPEO as the "Morning Mayor of Peoria" and station manager. In 1959, he left for New York's WMCA, and WPEO switched to country music in 1960.

In 1970, WPEO was bought by the Pinebrook Foundation, Inc., a Pennsylvania-based non-profit corporation, and switched to a Christian radio format. As of 2009, its programming is based on paid time for various national Christian programming sources. It is still restricted to daylight hours to protect clear-channel station KDKA in Pittsburgh.
