= 740 AM =

AM radio frequency

The following radio stations broadcast on AM frequency 740 kHz: 740 AM is a Canadian clear-channel frequency; CFZM in Toronto, Ontario, is the dominant Class A, clear-channel station on 740 AM.

== In Argentina ==
- LRH 251 in Chaco
- Radio Rebelde in Buenos Aires. (not the same station as the Radio Rebelde network of stations in Cuba)
- La Carretera in Allen, Río Negro.

== In Canada ==
Stations in bold are clear-channel stations.

| Call sign | City of license | Daytime power (kW) | Nighttime power (kW) | Transmitter coordinates |
|---|---|---|---|---|
| CBX | Edmonton, Alberta | 50 | 50 | 53.319444°N 113.445278°W |
| **CFZM** | Toronto, Ontario | 50 | 50 | 43.575°N 79.817222°W |

== In Colombia ==
- HJNS in Valledupar, Cesar

== In Cuba ==
- Radio Angulo in Sagua de Tánamo, Holguín

== In Mexico ==
- XECAQ-AM in Puerto Morelos, Quintana Roo
- XEKV-AM in Villahermosa, Tabasco
- XELTZ-AM in El Puertecito, Aguascalientes
- XEPOR-AM in Putla de Guerrero, Oaxaca
- XEQN-AM in Torreón, Coahuila
- XEVAY-AM in Puerto Vallarta, Jalisco

== In the United States ==
| Call sign | City of license | Facility ID | Class | Daytime power (kW) | Nighttime power (kW) | Critical hours power (kW) | Unlimited power (kW) | Transmitter coordinates |
|---|---|---|---|---|---|---|---|---|
| KATK | Carlsbad, New Mexico | 54513 | B | 1 | 0.5 | | | 32.450556°N 104.213056°W |
| KBRT | Costa Mesa, California | 34588 | D | 50 | 0.19 | | | 33.828889°N 117.638333°W |
| KCBS | San Francisco, California | 9637 | B | 50 | 50 | | | 38.139722°N 122.529167°W |
| KCIK | Kihei, Hawaii | 161239 | B | 5 | 5 | | | 20.791667°N 156.466944°W |
| KCMC | Texarkana, Texas | 33729 | D | 0.68 | 0.068 | | | 33.408333°N 94.046389°W |
| KIDR | Phoenix, Arizona | 6383 | B | 1 | 0.292 | | | 33.365278°N 112.108333°W |
| KMZN | Oskaloosa, Iowa | 31910 | D | 0.229 | 0.01 | | | 41.320833°N 92.645556°W |
| KNFL | Fargo, North Dakota | 135847 | B | 50 | 0.94 | 7.5 | | 46.974722°N 96.503333°W |
| KRMG | Tulsa, Oklahoma | 48729 | B | 50 | 25 | | | 36.080556°N 96.285833°W |
| KTRH | Houston, Texas | 35674 | B | 50 | 50 | | | 29.965833°N 94.942222°W |
| KVFC | Cortez, Colorado | 16434 | B | 1 | 0.25 | | | 37.349444°N 108.541389°W |
| KVOR | Colorado Springs, Colorado | 35869 | B | 3.3 | 1.5 | | | 39.083889°N 104.711389°W |
| WCXZ | Harrogate, Tennessee | 52656 | D | 0.9 | 0.007 | | | 36.561111°N 83.655833°W |
| WDGY | Hudson, Wisconsin | 6440 | D | 5 | | | | 44.968056°N 92.666944°W |
| WHMT | Tullahoma, Tennessee | 49836 | D | 0.25 | 0.011 | | | 35.343333°N 86.2°W |
| WIAC | San Juan, Puerto Rico | 4935 | B | | | | 10 | 18.356667°N 66.234722°W |
| WJFP | Chester, Pennsylvania | 74166 | D | 1 | 0.006 | | | 39.877222°N 75.406667°W |
| WMBG | Williamsburg, Virginia | 25021 | D | 0.5 | 0.007 | | | 37.281667°N 76.796944°W |
| WMSP | Montgomery, Alabama | 12316 | B | 10 | 0.233 | | | 32.421667°N 86.164167°W |
| WNOP | Newport, Kentucky | 15881 | D | 2.5 | 0.03 | | | 39.094722°N 84.583056°W |
| WNYH | Huntington, New York | 29259 | D | 25 | 0.043 | | | 40.851111°N 73.437778°W |
| WPAQ | Mount Airy, North Carolina | 54971 | D | 10 | 0.007 | 1 | | 36.534444°N 80.596667°W |
| WRNR | Martinsburg, West Virginia | 60104 | D | 0.5 | 0.021 | | | 39.473611°N 77.9325°W |
| WRPQ | Baraboo, Wisconsin | 3712 | D | 0.25 | 0.006 | | | 43.455278°N 89.753611°W |
| WVLN | Olney, Illinois | 69633 | D | 0.25 | 0.007 | | | 38.700278°N 88.081389°W |
| WYGM | Orlando, Florida | 51982 | B | 50 | 50 | | | 28.481389°N 81.661944°W |
