= Washington Speakers Bureau =

American agency

- Type: Private company
- Industry: Talent agency
- Founded: 1980; 46 years ago
- Founders: Bernie Swain; Paula Swain; Harry Rhoads Jr.
- Headquarters: Washington, D.C., United States
- Revenue: $150 million (2016)
- Parent: Omnicom Group
- Website: wsb.com

Washington Speakers Bureau (WSB) is a privately held speakers agency that offers talent representation and event consultation. Its roster includes former U.S. presidents, prime ministers, business executives, and journalists, among others.

The company was founded in 1980 by Bernie Swain, Paula Swain, and Harry Rhoads Jr, and it is headquartered in the Washington, D.C. metropolitan area. In 2000, the company was acquired by Omnicom Group but continues to run as an independent business within Omnicom's diversified-services division.

== History ==
Washington Speakers Bureau (WSB) was founded in 1980 by Bernie Swain, Paula Swain, and Harry Rhoads Jr. The creation of the agency was influenced by a conversation between Bernie Swain and Rhoads during their time working at George Washington University, where the two reviewed a Fortune article about the Harry Walker Agency, another speakers bureau. At its beginning, Bernie Swain ran the company out of a closet in a friend's office. While the business struggled in its infancy, only making $700 in revenue through its first year, it found success through its lax contract negotiations. The agency's first client was Steve Bell, who was a news anchor for Good Morning America. After Bell, the agency signed on with more journalists, like Peter Jennings, David Brinkley, and George Will, leading to a period of expansion, adding Alex Haley, Oliver North, and Terry Bradshaw to its roster of clients.

In 1988, WSB interviewed with former US President Ronald Reagan, competing with several major agencies to represent him and first lady Nancy Reagan. The Reagans ultimately selected the agency just after leaving office in February 1989, with Bernie Swain later learning that during the negotiations, WSB was "the only startup, and he wanted to give us a chance." Other government officials who signed with the agency, stemming from Reagan, include former British Prime Minister Margaret Thatcher and United States Army general Norman Schwarzkopf. Since then, the agency has worked with numerous political figures, pundits, and heads of state, including George W. Bush, Tony Blair, Bertie Ahern, Condoleezza Rice, Colin Powell, Madeleine Albright, James Baker, William Cohen, Donald Rumsfeld, Robert Gates, Alan Greenspan, Rudolph Giuliani, David Axelrod, Lou Dobbs, David Gergen, Paul Begala, Mike Allen, Mark Halperin, Tom Brokaw, and Rishi Sunak. The bureau also represented the former political satire troupe, Capitol Steps.

In January 2025, the Sports Business Journal reported that sports talent agency Athletes First (A1) had signed a partnership with Washington Speakers Bureau to market over 50 athletes, coaches, and executives for professional speaking opportunities.

== Operations ==
In 2011, co-founder Harry Rhoads Jr. was described by The Wall Street Journal as "the keeper of relationships", managing around 20 agents for the agency at the time.
