= XHCQR-FM =

Radio station in Cancún, Quintana Roo, Mexico

- Cancún, Quintana Roo; Mexico
- Frequency: 99.3 FM
- Branding: Lokura FM Rock

Programming
- Format: Classic rock

Ownership
- Owner: Gaia FM, A.C.
- Operator: Capital Media

History
- First air date: 2012
- Call sign meaning: Cancún, Quintana Roo

Technical information
- Licensing authority: CRT
- Class: A
- ERP: 3 kW
- HAAT: 85.67 m
- Transmitter coordinates: 21°08′16.72″N 86°49′55.99″W

Links
- Webcast: Listen live
- Website: lokurafm.com

XHCQR-FM is a noncommercial radio station in Cancún, Quintana Roo, Mexico. Broadcasting on 99.3 FM, XHCQR is owned by Gaia FM, A.C.

== History ==
Capital Pirata FM logo used from 2015 to 2018

The permit for XHCQR was awarded on January 11, 2012, to Gaia FM, A.C., along with additional permits for stations in Colima City (XHOMA-FM), Puerto Vallarta (XHGAI-FM) and Playa del Carmen (XHLAYA-FM).

In 2015, Gaia FM, A.C. was subsumed into Capital Media, which is a commercial radio station owner. The stations kept their format with a name change to Capital Pirata FM. In a 2018 filing with the IFT, Capital declared that it did not directly operate the Gaia FM stations but instead provided them with less than five percent of their broadcast day in news capsules and other material.

Like most Capital stations, XHCQR adopted the new Lokura FM adult hits format in 2020. When the Lokura brand was split in 2024, this station and XHLAYA-FM became Lokura FM Rock stations with English-language classic rock formats.
