= Lizbeth Gamboa Song =

Mexican politician and lawyer

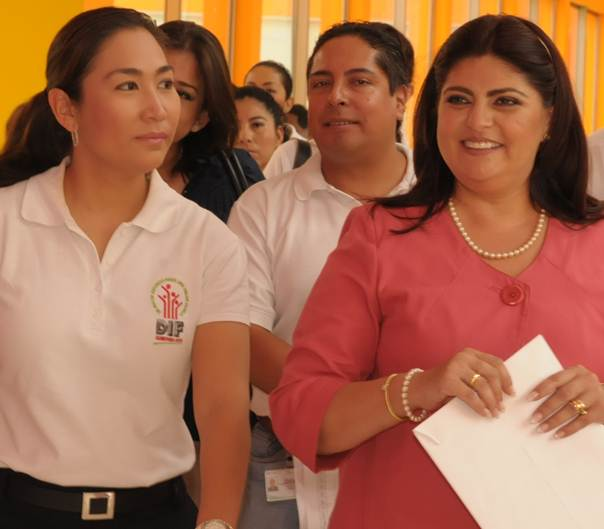
- Gamboa Song (left) as the director of the Quintana Roo state DIF
- Born: 31 March 1981 (age 45); Chetumal, Quintana Roo, Mexico
- Occupations: Deputy and lawyer
- Political party: PRI
- Spouse: Roberto Agundis

Lizbeth Loy Gamboa Song (born 31 March 1981) is a Mexican politician and lawyer affiliated with the PRI. She served as a federal deputy of the LXII Legislature of the Mexican Congress representing Quintana Roo from the third electoral region.

== Life ==
Gamboa Song was born in Chetumal. Her mother, Lizbeth Loy Song Escalante, was a state judge in Quintana Roo. After earning her undergraduate degree from the Universidad de las Américas Puebla and a master's from the Monterrey Institute of Technology and Higher Education, she entered public service in the Quintana Roo state government, first in its Mexico City office and then as the subsecretary of social development in the state Secretariat of Regional Planning and Development.

In 2007, Gamboa Song began a four-year stint as the head of the Quintana Roo state National System for Integral Family Development. She then served briefly as the head of the Instituto Quintanarroense de la Mujer (Quintana Roo Women's Institute) before being elected as a proportional representation federal deputy in 2012. During her three years as a deputy, she served on six commissions, including Constitutional Points, Fight Against Human Trafficking, and Transparency and Anticorruption.

In 2017, Gamboa Song and Song Escalante, as Corpulenta Operadora, S.A. de C.V. (which is publicly known as Song Comunicaciones), won concessions for two radio stations in Quintana Roo, XHPJMM-FM in José María Morelos and XHPMAH-FM in Mahahual.
