= Samuel B. Garver =

American politician (1839–1911)

Member of the Illinois House of Representatives
- In office 1897–1901

Personal details
- Born: Samuel Boyer Garver; August 21, 1839 Dauphin County, Pennsylvania, U.S.
- Died: September 14, 1911 (aged 72) Decatur, Illinois, U.S.
- Party: Republican
- Occupation: Politician, farmer

Military service
- Allegiance: United States
- Branch/service: United States Army (Union army)
- Unit: 73rd Illinois Infantry Regiment
- Battles/wars: American Civil War

Samuel Boyer Garver (August 21, 1839 – September 14, 1911) was an American farmer and politician.

Garver was born in Dauphin County, Pennsylvania. In 1855, he moved to Piatt County, Illinois and was involved with farming. Garver served in the 73rd Illinois Infantry Regiment during the American Civil War and was wounded. He lived in Farmer City, Illinois and was involved with the drug business. Garver served in the Illinois House of Representatives from 1897 to 1901 and was a Republican. In 1906, Garver moved to Decatur, Illinois. Garve died in Decatur, Illinois.
