= Santa Anna Township, DeWitt County, Illinois =

Santa Anna Township
- Township
- Location in DeWitt County

- DeWitt County's location in Illinois
- Coordinates: 40°14′23″N 88°38′55″W
- Country: United States
- State: Illinois
- County: DeWitt
- Established: November 2, 1858

Area
  - Total: 29.02 sq mi (75.2 km^{2})
  - Land: 28.90 sq mi (74.9 km^{2})
  - Water: 0.13 sq mi (0.34 km^{2}) 0.44%
- Elevation: 715 ft (218 m)

Population (2020)
  - Total: 2,276
  - Density: 78.75/sq mi (30.41/km^{2})
- Time zone: UTC-6 (CST)
  - Summer (DST): UTC-5 (CDT)
- ZIP code: 61842
- FIPS code: 17-039-67639
- GNIS feature ID: 429713
- Website: santaannatownship.org

Santa Anna Township is one of thirteen townships in DeWitt County, Illinois, USA. As of the 2020 census, its population was 2,276 and it contained 1,085 housing units. Its name was changed from Mt. Pleasant Township on June 7, 1859 in honor of the Comanche war chief who became a peace advocate, Santa Anna.

== Geography ==
According to the 2021 census gazetteer files, Santa Anna Township has a total area of 29.02 square miles (75.16 km^{2}), of which 28.90 square miles (74.85 km^{2}) (or 99.56%) is land and 0.13 square miles (0.34 km^{2}) (or 0.44%) is water.

=== Cities, towns, villages ===
- Farmer City

=== Unincorporated towns ===
- Watkins at 40.280868°N 88.677290°W

(This list is based on USGS data and may include former settlements.)

=== Cemeteries ===
The township contains these five cemeteries: Campground, Farmer City, Greenleaf, Maple Grove and Saint Josephs Catholic.

== Demographics ==
Historical population
Census	Pop.	Note	%±
1930	2,186		—
1940	2,277		4.2%
1950	2,305		1.2%
1960	2,322		0.7%
1970	2,552		9.9%
1980	2,706		6.0%
1990	2,550		−5.8%
2000	2,509		−1.6%
2010	2,502		−0.3%
2020	2,276		−9.0%

As of the 2020 census there were 2,276 people, 959 households, and 628 families residing in the township. The population density was 78.42 inhabitants per square mile (30.28/km^{2}). There were 1,085 housing units at an average density of 37.38 per square mile (14.43/km^{2}). The racial makeup of the township was 94.02% White, 0.75% African American, 0.09% Native American, 0.09% Asian, 0.13% Pacific Islander, 0.31% from other races, and 4.61% from two or more races. Hispanic or Latino of any race were 1.93% of the population.

There were 959 households, out of which 25.20% had children under the age of 18 living with them, 59.02% were married couples living together, 5.32% had a female householder with no spouse present, and 34.52% were non-families. 32.60% of all households were made up of individuals, and 16.20% had someone living alone who was 65 years of age or older. The average household size was 2.33 and the average family size was 2.92.

The township's age distribution consisted of 21.8% under the age of 18, 4.2% from 18 to 24, 16.3% from 25 to 44, 35.8% from 45 to 64, and 22.0% who were 65 years of age or older. The median age was 49.3 years. For every 100 females, there were 80.1 males. For every 100 females age 18 and over, there were 82.0 males.

The median income for a household in the township was $63,920, and the median income for a family was $83,750. Males had a median income of $36,208 versus $30,500 for females. The per capita income for the township was $27,376. About 8.1% of families and 11.6% of the population were below the poverty line, including 17.8% of those under age 18 and 11.6% of those age 65 or over.

== School districts ==
- Blue Ridge Community Unit School District 18
- DeLand-Weldon Community Unit School District 57

== Political districts ==
- Illinois's 15th congressional district
- State House District 87
- State Senate District 44
