= WMBG =

- Williamsburg, Virginia; United States
- Broadcast area: Virginia Peninsula
- Frequency: 740 kHz
- Branding: WMBG AM-740

Programming
- Format: Adult standards; oldies; classic hits
- Affiliations: Westwood One (America's Best Music); ABC News Radio

Ownership
- Owner: Gregory H. Granger; (Williamsburg's Radio Station, Inc.)

History
- First air date: November 14, 1959
- Former call signs: WBCI (1959–1971); WMBG (1971–1980); WBCI (1980–1981); WMBG (1981–1985); WQSF (1985–1986)
- Call sign meaning: Williamsburg

Technical information
- Licensing authority: FCC
- Facility ID: 25021
- Class: D
- Power: 500 watts daytime; 7 watts nighttime
- Transmitter coordinates: 37°16′54.5″N 76°47′47.9″W
- Translators: 93.5 W228DX (Williamsburg); 97.7 W249CT (Williamsburg)

Links
- Public license information: Public file; LMS
- Webcast: Listen live
- Website: www.wmbgradio.com

WMBG (740 kHz) is a commercial AM radio station licensed in Williamsburg, Virginia, serving the Virginia Peninsula. WMBG is owned and operated by Gregory H. Granger. It airs local news and talk, as well as a mix of adult standards, oldies, and classic hits formats.

The station operates with 500 watts omnidirectional by day. Because 740 is a clear-channel frequency reserved for Class A station CFZM in Toronto, WMBG must reduce power to 7 watts at night to avoid interference.

WMBG programming is simulcast full time on an FM translator station, W228DX, 93.5 MHz.

== History ==
On November 14, 1959, the station first signed on as WBCI. The station was owned by the Williamsburg Broadcasting Company.
