= XHPJMM-FM =

Radio station in José María Morelos, Quintana Roo

- José María Morelos, Quintana Roo; Mexico
- Frequency: 93.3 FM
- Branding: Presumida FM

Programming
- Format: Pop

Ownership
- Owner: Song Comunicaciones; (Corpulenta Operadora, S.A. de C.V.)
- Sister stations: XHPMAH-FM Mahahual

History
- First air date: March 2018
- Call sign meaning: José María Morelos

Technical information
- Licensing authority: CRT
- Class: AA
- ERP: 6 kW
- HAAT: 30.60 m

Links
- Website: XHPJMM-FM on Facebook

XHPJMM-FM is a radio station on 93.3 FM in José María Morelos, Quintana Roo, Mexico. It is owned by Song Comunicaciones and carries a pop format known as Presumida FM.

== History ==
XHPJMM was awarded in the IFT-4 radio auction of 2017 and came to air in March 2018. Corpulenta Operadora is owned by Lizbeth Loy Song Escalada, a former Quintana Roo state judge, and her daughter Lizbeth Loy Gamboa Song, a former federal deputy.
