= Lott R. Herrick =

American judge (1871–1937)

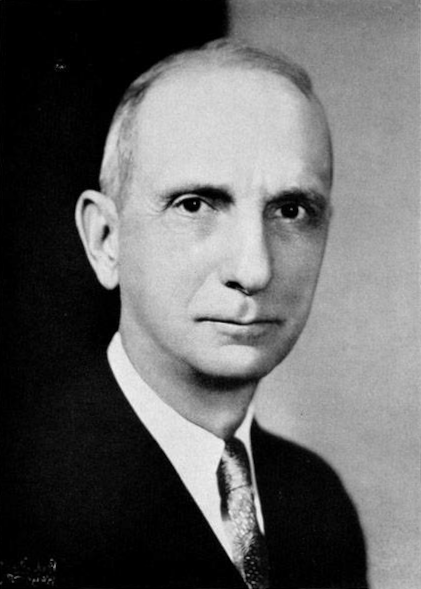
- Herrick's official photograph, c. 1935

Justice of the Supreme Court of Illinois
- In office 1933 – September 18, 1937

Personal details
- Born: Lott Russell Herrick; December 8, 1871
- Died: September 18, 1937 (aged 65) Rochester, Minnesota, U.S.
- Resting place: Farmer City, Illinois, U.S.
- Education: University of Illinois Urbana-Champaign; University of Michigan
- Occupation: Lawyer, jurist

Lott Russell Herrick (December 8, 1871 – September 18, 1937) was an American lawyer and jurist.

Born in Farmer City, Illinois, Herrick graduated from Farmer City High School in 1888. He then graduated from the Liberal Arts School of the University of Illinois Urbana-Champaign in 1892 and the University of Michigan Law School in 1894. He then practiced law with his father and later with his brother in Farmer City, Illinois. From 1902 to 1904, Herrick served as county judge of DeWitt County, Illinois. He also served as president of the Board of Education of the Moore Township High School. From 1933 until his death in 1937, Herrick served on the Illinois Supreme Court. Herrick died in Rochester, Minnesota at the Mayo Clinic from brain lesions. He was buried in Farmer City, Illinois.
