= XHJRS-FM =

Radio station in Jalpa, Zacatecas, Mexico

- Jalpa, Zacatecas; Mexico
- Frequency: 95.1 FM
- Branding: Caxcán FM

Ownership
- Owner: Grupo Radiofónico Zer; (Josefina Reyes Sahagún)

History
- First air date: November 30, 2011 (permit)
- Call sign meaning: Josefina Reyes Sahagún

Technical information
- Licensing authority: CRT
- Class: A
- ERP: 3 kW
- HAAT: −212.8 m (−698 ft)

Links
- Website: grupozer.mx

XHJRS-FM is a radio station on 95.1 FM in Jalpa, Zacatecas, Mexico. The station is owned by Grupo Radiofónico ZER and is known as Caxcán FM.

== History ==
XHJRS was permitted on November 30, 2011.
