= XHMAI-FM =

Radio station in Mapastepec, Chiapas

- Mapastepec, Chiapas; Mexico
- Frequency: 95.1 FM
- Branding: Extremo

Programming
- Format: Grupera

Ownership
- Owner: Radio Núcleo; (XHMAI-FM, S.A. de C.V.)

History
- First air date: September 3, 1994 (concession)
- Call sign meaning: MApastepec ChIapas

Technical information
- Class: B
- ERP: 26.04 kW
- HAAT: -43.16 m
- Transmitter coordinates: 15°25′1.5″N 92°49′39″W

Links
- Website: www.lameramadre.mx

XHMAI-FM is a radio station on 95.1 FM in Mapastepec, Chiapas, Mexico. It is owned by Radio Núcleo and carries a grupera format known as Extremo.

== History ==
XHMAI received its concession on September 3, 1994. It was owned by Juan Carlos Bravo Ortiz and broadcast on 97.3 MHz.

XHMAI moved to 95.1 MHz and increased its power with technical authorizations issued in 1999 and 2001. In January 2018, the station changed its image and became known as La Mera Madre In 2022 I modify the name For La Mandona In 2025 Return to its previous format As Extremo.
