= XHNUC-FM =

Radio station in Cancún, Quintana Roo, Mexico

- Cancún, Quintana Roo; Mexico
- Frequency: 105.1 MHz
- Branding: Radio Turquesa

Programming
- Format: Regional Mexican

Ownership
- Owner: Grupo Turquesa; (Televisión y Radio Caribe, S.A. de C.V.)
- Sister stations: XHCANQ-FM Cancún, XHPCHQ-FM Chetumal

History
- First air date: November 22, 1989
- Call sign meaning: Anagram of Cancún

Technical information
- Licensing authority: CRT
- Class: C
- ERP: 100 kW
- HAAT: 119.8 m (393 ft)

Links
- Webcast: Listen live
- Website: radioturquesa.fm

XHNUC-FM 105.1 is a radio station in Cancún, Quintana Roo, Mexico, known as Radio Turquesa. It is owned by Grupo Turquesa and was founded by Gaston Alegre López, a longtime radio entrepreneur, hotel owner, and PRD politician in the state.

XHNUC "Radio Turquesa" is not to be confused with sister station XHCANQ-FM 102.7 "Turquesa Pop", which is commonly owned but a noncommercial (permit) station.

Radio Turquesa is heard statewide and in parts of Yucatán on several repeaters and additional stations owned by Grupo Turquesa.

== Repeaters ==
XHNUC-FM is the only station in Mexico to have non-co-channel repeaters on the same concession. Authorized in the 1990s, the network gives XHNUC coverage of key population centers in Quintana Roo. In 1999, the network was partially closed in evident political retribution for Alegre's candidacy for Governor of Quintana Roo; a federal court ordered the transmitters returned to service in 2000, ruling that the state branch of the Secretariat of Communications and Transportation had acted incorrectly.

Rebroadcasters of XHNUC-FM
City of licence	Identifier	Frequency	Power
Kantunilkín	XHNUC-FM	100.1	100 watts
Nuevo Xcán	XHNUC-FM	104.5	100 watts
Playa del Carmen	XHNUC-FM	99.7	100 watts
Cozumel	XHNUC-FM	93.9	100 watts
Tulum	XHNUC-FM	100.1	100 watts
Felipe Carrillo Puerto	XHNUC-FM	99.7	100 watts
Chetumal	XHNUC-FM	100.1	100 watts

== Satellite stations ==
These stations air Radio Turquesa programming but have separate concessions. Grupo Turquesa won these stations in the IFT-4 radio station auction of 2017.

Rebroadcasters of XHNUC-FM
City of licence	Identifier	Frequency	Power
Felipe Carrillo Puerto	XHPCPQ-FM	96.7	2,183 watts
José María Morelos	XHPJOS-FM	92.5	3,857 watts
Nicolás Bravo	XHPNIC-FM	93.3	3,055 watts
Tulum	XHPTLM-FM	93.5	25,147 watts
Temax, Yucatán	XHPMAX-FM	100.5	8,687 watts
Tunkás, Yucatán	XHPTUN-FM	88.1	6,000 watts
