= Hilario Chi Canul =

Mexican linguist of Maya ethnicity

- Born: 16 October 1981 (age 44); Tlaxiaco, Oaxaca, Mexico
- Occupation: Professor of Maya
- Known for: Linguistics, Mayan languages, film work

Hilario Chi Canul (born 16 October 1981) is a Mexican linguist of Maya ethnicity who worked as a translator and Yucatec Maya language coach in the production of the 2006 movie Apocalypto by Mel Gibson.

== Life ==
In 2007 he won the first prize in the Mexican government's competition of indigenous language rhetoric. He is Professor of Maya at the University of Quintana Roo (UQRoo). He has worked as Maya language narrator in a number of commercial, art, and educational films. He is also involved in the movement to revive Mexico's indigenous heritage. He has given talks about his experience as a Maya translator working in the film industry at several American Universities. Chi Canul also served as producer and lead actor in the first ever Maya-language telenovia Baktun in 2013.
