= XHFJ-FM =

Radio station in Teziutlán, Puebla, Mexico

- Teziutlán, Puebla, Mexico; Mexico
- Frequency: 95.1 MHz
- Branding: La Ke Buena

Programming
- Format: Regional Mexican
- Affiliations: Radiópolis

Ownership
- Owner: Radio Teziutlán, S.A. de C.V.

History
- First air date: August 1952; March 2012 (on FM)
- Former call signs: XEFJ-AM

Technical information
- ERP: 6 kW
- Transmitter coordinates: 19°47′06″N 97°22′45″W

Links
- Webcast: Listen live
- Website: kebuenateziutlan.com

XHFJ-FM is a radio station in Teziutlán, Puebla, Mexico, broadcasting on 95.1 FM and carries the La Ke Buena national format from Radiópolis.

== History ==
XEFJ-AM 680 received its concession on February 20, 1952 and came to air that August. Originally owned by Teodora Matus de Ferraez, it was sold to Radio Teziutlán, S.A. in 1968 and migrated to FM in 2012.
