= XHNH-FM =

Radio station in Irapuato, Guanajuato

Irapuato, Guanajuato; Mexico
- Frequency: 95.1 MHz
- Branding: Stereo 95

Programming
- Format: English classic hits

Ownership
- Owner: Radio Grupo Antonio Contreras; (Marco Antonio Contreras Chávez; Alicia Hortensia, Amparo Hilda and Adela Contreras Santos)

History
- First air date: August 2, 1976

Technical information
- ERP: 36.03 kW

Links
- Website: www.radioirapuato.com

XHNH-FM is a radio station on 95.1 FM in Irapuato, Guanajuato. XHNH is owned by Radio Grupo Antonio Contreras and carries a classic hits format known as Stereo 95.

== History ==
XHNH received its concession on October 14, 1976, two months after signing on August 2. It was the first FM radio station in Irapuato.
