= Steve Bell (news anchor) =

American journalist and educator (1935–2019)

- Born: Stephen Scott Bell; December 9, 1935; Oskaloosa, Iowa
- Died: January 25, 2019 (aged 83); Muncie, Indiana
- Education: Central College, Pella, Iowa, BA 1959, PhD, 1969; Northwestern U., MS, 1963
- Occupations: television reporter, anchorman
- Employer(s): Ball State University, USA Network, KYW-TV, ABC, WNEW, WOW-TV, WGN and WGN-TV Radio-TV, WOI-TV, KBOE-FM
- Spouse: Joyce Dillavou
- Awards: Emmy nominations, 1965, 73; Overseas Press Club award, 1969; Headliner award, 1975

Stephen Scott Bell (December 9, 1935 – January 25, 2019) was an American journalist and educator. He was news anchor of the ABC News programs Good Morning America and World News This Morning, and a professor emeritus of telecommunications at Ball State University.

== Early life ==
A native of Oskaloosa, Iowa, Bell studied as an undergraduate at Iowa's Central College and went on to earn a master's degree in journalism from Northwestern University.

== Career ==
Bell was an ABC News correspondent from 1967 to 1986. He first covered the Vietnam War in 1967, and was held in detention in Cambodia in 1970 while investigating an alleged massacre of nearly 100 Vietnamese civilians by Cambodian soldiers. He met Ted Koppel, later the anchor of the ABC program Nightline, during his years in Southeast Asia, and they became good friends. After his return to the United States, he began working on Good Morning America, becoming the broadcast's news anchor in 1975. On January 28, 1986, Bell broke the news via an ABC News Special Report that the space shuttle Challenger had exploded. He stayed for 11 years. He left ABC in 1986 and moved to Philadelphia, Pennsylvania, to co-anchor evening newscasts for KYW-TV. While there, he also anchored short-form news updates for the USA Network, alongside his colleagues at KYW, titled USA Updates.

Bell left KYW in 1992 during an overhaul of the station's newscasts. He became a telecommunications professor at Ball State University in August 1992. He was inducted into the Indiana Journalism Hall of Fame in 2004. Interviewed in 2005, Bell said he did not miss his work as a newscaster and reporter. He retired from Ball State in 2007, becoming a professor emeritus.

Bell appeared on Nightline in 2005 to present a report on how China has changed since Mao's rule; he and Koppel had earlier filmed a documentary there during the Mao Zedong era. The Steve Bell News Packaging Scholarship is given each semester at Ball State University to students for excellence in television news story packaging.

== Death ==
Bell died on January 25, 2019, at the age of 83.
