= XHROO-FM =

Radio station in Chetumal, Quintana Roo

- Chetumal, Quintana Roo; Mexico
- Frequency: 95.3 MHz
- Branding: La Lupe

Programming
- Format: Variety hits
- Affiliations: Multimedios Radio

Ownership
- Owner: Grupo SIPSE; (Radio Cancún, S.A. de C.V.)
- Operator: Multimedios Radio
- Sister stations: XHROOC-FM

History
- First air date: November 21, 1988 (concession)
- Call sign meaning: Quintana Roo

Technical information
- Licensing authority: CRT
- Class: B1
- ERP: 9.24 kW
- HAAT: 73.80 m

Links
- Webcast: XHROO-FM

XHROO-FM 95.3 is a radio station in Chetumal, Quintana Roo, Mexico, known as La Lupe. It is owned by Grupo SIPSE.

== History ==
XHROO received its concession on November 21, 1988.
