= KMLY =

Radio station in Gonzales, California

- Gonzales, California; United States
- Broadcast area: Salinas, California
- Frequency: 95.1 MHz
- Branding: La Mexicana 95.1 FM

Programming
- Format: Regional Mexican

Ownership
- Owner: Lazer Media; (Lazer Licenses, LLC)

History
- First air date: July 4, 2012
- Former frequencies: 105.9 MHz (2012–2017)

Technical information
- Licensing authority: FCC
- Facility ID: 164096
- Class: A
- ERP: 6,000 watts
- HAAT: 100 meters (330 ft)
- Transmitter coordinates: 36°27′34.20″N 121°17′54.80″W

Links
- Public license information: Public file; LMS
- Website: radiolazer.com

KMLY is a Regional Mexican class A radio station in Gonzales, California.

== History ==
KMLY went on the air on July 4, 2012, originally licensed to serve Carmel Valley, California at 105.9 FM.
