= XHACS-FM =

Radio station in Playa del Carmen, Quintana Roo

- Playa del Carmen; Mexico
- Frequency: 103.1 FM
- Branding: Playa FM 103.1

Programming
- Format: Pop

Ownership
- Owner: Isaac Caballero Colli; (Arte y Cultura por Solidaridad, A.C.)
- Sister stations: XHICT-FM Tulum, XHCCE-FM Chetumal

History
- First air date: July 2018
- Call sign meaning: Arte y Cultura por Solidaridad

Technical information
- Licensing authority: CRT
- Class: A
- ERP: 3 kW
- HAAT: 34.7 m
- Transmitter coordinates: 20°39′38.9″N 97°03′55.5″W

Links
- Website: XHACS-FM on Facebook

XHACS-FM is a radio station broadcasting on 103.1 FM in Playa del Carmen, Quintana Roo, Mexico, branded as Playa FM 103.1.

== History ==
On November 17, 2015, Arte y Cultura por Solidaridad, owned by Manuel Isaac and Fayne Yazmin Caballero Colli, applied for the 103.1 social frequency in Playa del Carmen, which the Federal Telecommunications Institute (IFT) had made available in its 2015 FM station program. A competing application was filed on November 30 by Yantra Informativo Fusión, A.C.

The IFT adjudicated the two applications on February 14, 2018, choosing Arte y Cultura por Solidaridad. The IFT noted that stakeholders in the other applicant, Yantra Informativo Fusión, were associated with Grupo Acustik, a new media group that won 15 radio stations in the IFT-4 auction of 2017. Because the principals of Arte y Cultura por Solidaridad owned no radio stations, their application was chosen, and 103.1 was assigned the callsign XHACS-FM.

XHACS-FM began testing in July 2017 and adopted the name "Playa FM". Related social applicants also won stations at the IFT in 2018, including XHICT-FM 104.7 "Tulum FM" and XHCCE-FM 90.5 "Jaguar FM" in Chetumal.
