= XHWO-FM =

Radio station in Chetumal, Quintana Roo, Mexico

XHWO-FM / XEWO-AM
- Chetumal, Quintana Roo; Mexico
- Frequency: 97.7 FM / 1020 AM
- Branding: Sol Stereo

Programming
- Format: Full-service radio

Ownership
- Owner: Grupo Sol Comunicaciones; (Luis Alberto Pavía Mendoza)
- Sister stations: XHRB-FM/XERB-AM Cozumel

History
- First air date: March 8, 1984; 1994 (FM)

Technical information
- Licensing authority: CRT
- Class: B1 (FM); C (AM)
- Power: 10 kW day/1 kW night
- ERP: 10 kW
- HAAT: 63.60 m

Links
- Website: sol899.com

XHWO-FM 97.7/XEWO-AM 1020 is a combo radio station in Chetumal, Quintana Roo, Mexico. It is known as Sol Stereo.

== History ==
XEWO received its first concession in March 1984. It became an FM combo in 1994.
