= XHPPLY-FM =

96.1 FM station in Playa del Carmen

- Playa del Carmen, Quintana Roo; Mexico
- Frequency: 96.1 FM (HD Radio)
- Branding: Grupo Cantón Radio

Programming
- Format: Pop

Ownership
- Owner: CJR Radio; (AGC Radio Sureste, S.A. de C.V. (pending sale to Grupo Cantón))
- Operator: Grupo Cantón
- Sister stations: XHPTOM-FM Puerto Morelos

History
- First air date: November 2018
- Call sign meaning: Playa (del Carmen)

Technical information
- Licensing authority: CRT
- Class: A
- ERP: 2.5 kW
- HAAT: 84.4 m (277 ft)
- Transmitter coordinates: 20°36′34.59″N 87°06′27.76″W

Links
- Website: https://grupocantonradio.com/

XHPPLY-FM is a radio station on 96.1 FM in Playa del Carmen, Quintana Roo, Mexico. It is the local franchise of the is operated by Grupo Radio Cantón and carries its Pop format.

== History ==
XHPPLY was awarded in the IFT-4 radio auction of 2017 on a rebound after the initial winning bidder, Tecnoradio, failed to pay for dozens of stations they had bought across the country, including their 55.7 million peso bid for this frequency. The winning bid by a consortium of Carlos de Jesús Aguirre Gómez and CJAguirre Nacional, S.A.P.I. de C.V., was 11.5 million pesos.
