= José María Morelos Municipality =

José María Morelos
- Municipality
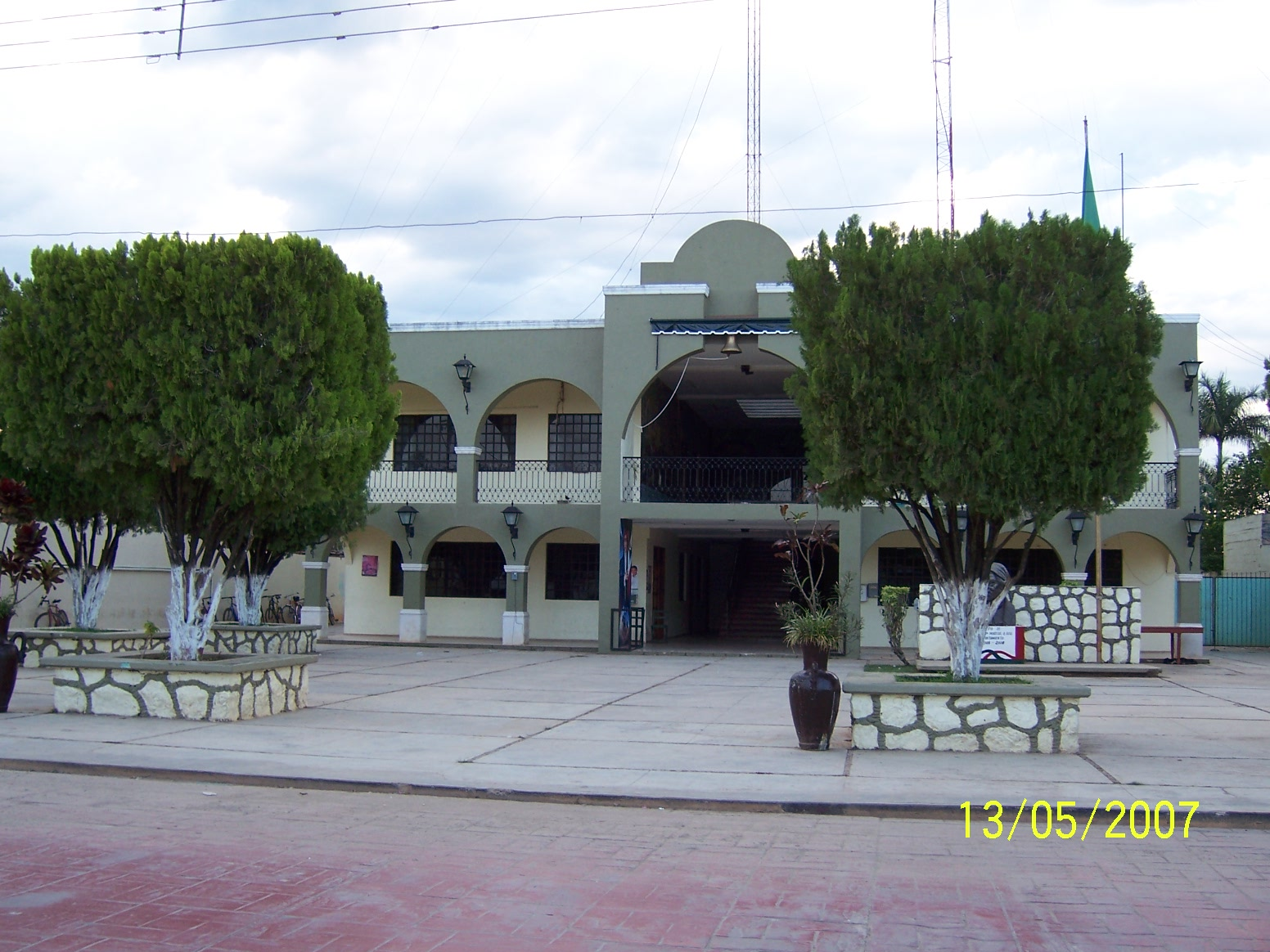
- Jose María Morelos municipal hall

- Coat of arms

- Location of Municipality in Quintana Roo

- Location within Mexico
- Coordinates: 19°45′N 88°42′W
- Country: Mexico
- State: Quintana Roo
- Municipal seat: José María Morelos

Government
  - Municipal President: Otto Ventura Osorio

Area
  - Municipality: 6,739 km^{2} (2,602 sq mi)
- Elevation: 31 m (102 ft)

Population (2020 census)
  - Municipality: 39,165
  - Density: 5.812/km^{2} (15.05/sq mi)
  - Urban: 14,620
- Time zone: UTC–05:00 (Zona Sureste)
- INEGI Code: 23006
- Website: www.josemariamorelos.gob.mx

José María Morelos is one of the eleven municipalities that make up the Mexican state of Quintana Roo.

== Geography ==
Like most of the Yucatan Peninsula José María Morelos is entirely flat with a gentle slope towards the sea, so from west to east.

Like the rest of the peninsula's surface the land has a limestone base that does not allow the formation of surface water flows such as rivers and streams, the water instead form flows in underground rivers that sometimes rise to the surface in cenotes. Lakes and cenotes are the major bodies of water in the municipality.

=== Communities ===
There were 129 populated localities, as well as 132 unpopulated localities enumerated during the 2010 census.

The largest localities (cities, towns, and villages) are:

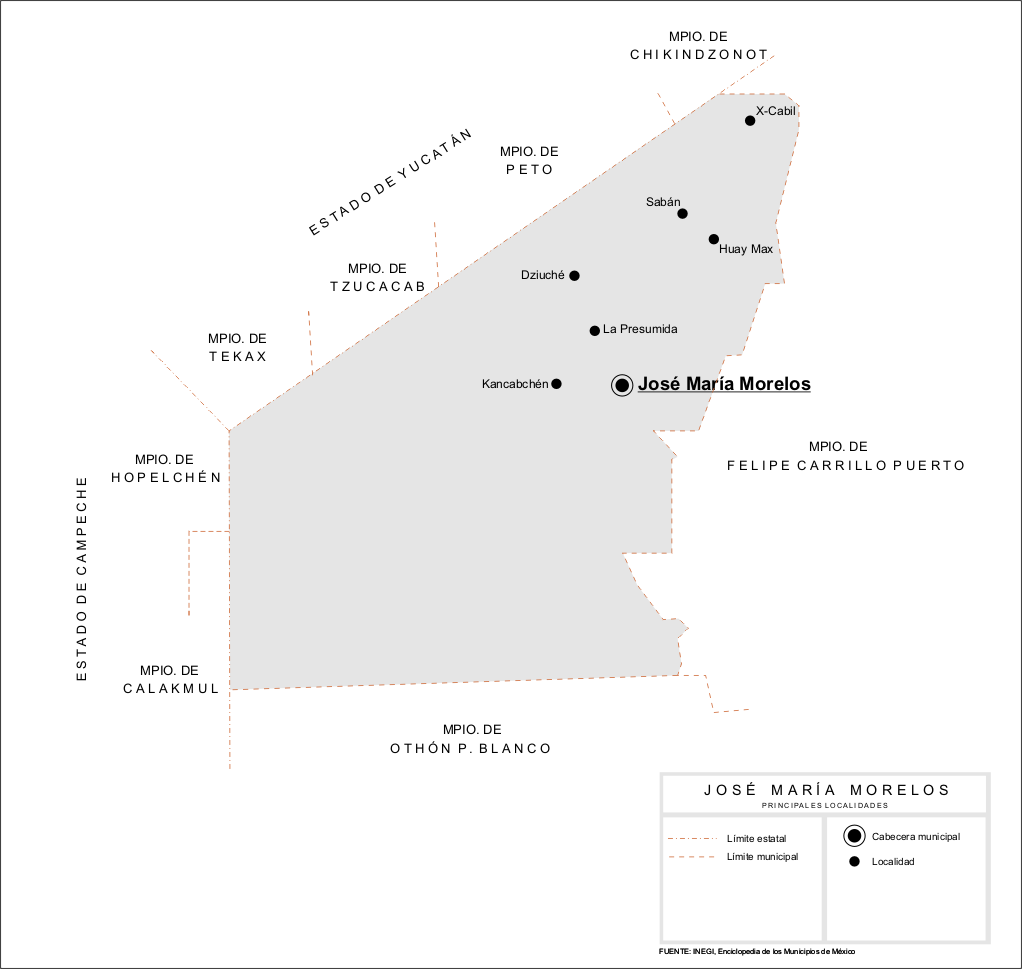
Map of Jose Maria Morelos

Name	Population (2010 Census)
José María Morelos	11,750
Dziuché	2,870
Sabán	2,167
Huay Max	1,399
La Presumida	1,357
X-Cabil	1,087
Kancabchén	1,083
Sacalaca	1,010
Candelaria	963
Santa Gertrudis	899
Total municipality	36,179

== Demographics ==
Historical population
Year	Pop.	±% p.a.
1995	29,604	—
2000	31,052	+0.96%
2005	32,746	+1.07%
2010	36,179	+2.01%
Source: INEGI Instituto Nacional de Estadística y Geografía
