= XHGAI-FM =

Radio station in Puerto Vallarta, Jalisco, Mexico

- Puerto Vallarta, Jalisco; Mexico
- Frequency: 105.9 MHz
- Branding: Lokura FM Rock

Programming
- Format: Classic rock

Ownership
- Owner: Gaia FM, A.C.
- Operator: Capital Media

History
- First air date: Late 2013
- Call sign meaning: From the name of the owner

Technical information
- Licensing authority: CRT
- Class: A
- ERP: 3 kW
- HAAT: −114.8 m (−377 ft)
- Transmitter coordinates: 20°36′39″N 105°13′34″W

Links
- Webcast: Listen live
- Website: lokurafm.com/vallarta

XHGAI-FM 105.9 is a noncommercial radio station in Puerto Vallarta, Jalisco, Mexico. Broadcasting on 105.9 FM, XHGAI is owned by Gaia FM, A.C., and operated by Capital Media as Lokura FM Rock with a classic rock format.

== History ==
Capital Pirata logo used from 2015 to 2018

The permit for XHGAI was awarded on January 11, 2012, to Gaia FM, A.C., along with additional permits for stations in Colima, Colima (XHOMA-FM), Cancún and Playa del Carmen, signed XHGAI on late in 2013 with its Pirata FM rock music format, which also aired on its two stations in Quintana Roo.

In 2015, Gaia FM, A.C. was subsumed into Capital Media, which is a commercial radio station owner. Capital, which already owned a station in Colima, divested that station and retained the other three. The stations kept their format with a name change to Capital Pirata FM.

On January 1, 2019, the Capital Pirata FM format was replaced with the Capital Máxima grupera brand; this was the first Gaia FM station operated by Capital to leave the Pirata FM format. It then flipped to Capital FM (pop) on January 31, 2020. On June 8, 2020, XHGAI was one of seven stations to debut the new Lokura FM adult hits brand.

In a 2018 filing with the IFT, Capital declared that it did not directly operate the Gaia FM stations but instead provided them with less than five percent of their broadcast day in news capsules and other material.

The station was originally authorized to broadcast from the Plaza Caracol shopping center, but the Federal Telecommunications Institute approved a relocation in 2022 to a facility on the city's southeast edge. This coincided with Capital ceasing to operate the station in late October 2022, which came under the operation of Alberto Marrón McNaught as "Xpectro FM", with a format targeted to Generation X audiences. Xpectro FM lasted less than a year, and Capital resumed operating the station in 2023. It changed formats to the rock version of Lokura FM in early 2024.
