= KRGX =

Radio station in Rio Grande City, Texas

Coordinates: 26°26′05″N 98°55′45″W

95KRGC Radio
- Rio Grande City, Texas; United States
- Frequency: 95.1 (MHz)
- Branding: KRGC Radio

Programming
- Format: Christian

Ownership
- Owner: Ministering Missions International

History
- First air date: August 5, 2008
- Former call signs: 95KRGC Radio (2008-2024)

Technical information
- Licensing authority: FCC
- Facility ID: 164194
- Class: A
- ERP: 6,000 watts
- HAAT: 100 meters (330 ft)

Links
- Public license information: Radio Public file; LMS

KRGC 95.1 FM is a radio station licensed to Rio Grande City, Texas, United States. The station broadcasts a Christian format and is owned by Ministeting Missions International
