= XHICT-FM =

Radio station in Tulum, Quintana Roo

- Tulum, Quintana Roo; Mexico
- Frequency: 104.7 FM
- Branding: Tulum FM

Programming
- Format: Variety

Ownership
- Owner: Isaac Caballero Colli; (Identidad Cultural por Tulum, A.C.)
- Sister stations: XHACS-FM Playa del Carmen, XHCCE-FM Chetumal

History
- First air date: 2019
- Call sign meaning: Identidad Cultural por Tulum

Technical information
- Licensing authority: CRT
- Class: A
- ERP: 2.89 kW
- HAAT: 23.60 m

Links
- Website: tulumfm1047.wixsite.com

XHICT-FM is a radio station on 104.7 FM in Tulum, Quintana Roo, in Mexico. It is known as Tulum FM 104.7.

== History ==
On November 17, 2015, Identidad Cultural por Tulum, owned by Manuel Isaac and Fayne Yazmin Caballero Colli, applied for the 104.7 social frequency at Tulum that the Federal Telecommunications Institute (IFT) had made available in its 2015 FM station program. The IFT approved the application on December 13, 2017, and granted a concession for XHICT-FM.

XHICT-FM began broadcasting in 2019 and adopted the name "Tulum FM". Related social applicants also won stations at the IFT in 2018, for XHACS-FM 103.1 in Playa del Carmen and XHCCE-FM 90.5 "Jaguar FM" in Chetumal.
