= 1020 AM =

AM radio frequency

The following radio stations broadcast on AM frequency 1020 kHz: 1020 AM is a clear-channel U.S. frequency. KDKA Pittsburgh and KVNT Eagle River, Alaska, share Class A status of 1020 AM.

== In Argentina ==
- LRA58 in Rio Mayo, Chubut
- LRJ214 in San Juan
- LT10 in Santa Fe

== In Mexico ==
- XEPR-AM in Poza Rica, Veracruz
- XEWO-AM in Chetumal, Quintana Roo

== In the United States ==
Stations in bold are clear-channel stations.

Call sign	City of license	Facility ID	Class	Daytime power (kW)	Nighttime power (kW)	Critical hours power (kW)	Unlimited power (kW)	Transmitter coordinates
KCKN	Roswell, New Mexico	57721	B	50	50			33.464722°N 104.499444°W
**KDKA**	Pittsburgh, Pennsylvania	25443	A				50	40.559167°N 79.953056°W
KDYK	Union Gap, Washington	64506	B	4	0.4			46.571389°N 120.454167°W (daytime); 46.570556°N 120.454167°W (nighttime)
KJJK	Fergus Falls, Minnesota	76	D	1.9	0.011			46.245278°N 95.979444°W
KMMQ	Plattsmouth, Nebraska	52802	B	50	1.4			41.086667°N 95.712778°W (daytime); 41.085833°N 95.7125°W (nighttime)
KOKP	Perry, Oklahoma	62346	B	0.4	0.25			36.259722°N 97.216944°W
KTNQ	Los Angeles, California	35673	B	50	50			34.033333°N 117.983333°W
**KVNT**	Eagle River, Alaska	53491	A	10	10			61.485278°N 149.763889°W
KWIQ	Moses Lake North, Washington	35886	B	2	0.4			47.163333°N 119.360833°W
WCIL	Carbondale, Illinois	65950	D	1				37.725278°N 89.256944°W
WHDD	Sharon, Connecticut	67774	D	2.5		1.8		41.976389°N 73.524167°W
WLVJ	Boynton Beach, Florida	3607	B	4.7	1.5			26.473889°N 80.203056°W
WOQI	Adjuntas, Puerto Rico	64593	B	1	0.28			18.151111°N 66.713333°W
WPEO	Peoria, Illinois	52641	D	1				40.698056°N 89.525278°W
WRIX	Homeland Park, South Carolina	1216	D	10				34.470556°N 82.634167°W
WWAC	Ocean City/Somers Point, New Jersey	19617	D	1.9		0.68		39.229167°N 74.681389°W
