= KNUW =

- Santa Clara, New Mexico; United States
- Broadcast area: Silver City, New Mexico; Grant County, New Mexico
- Frequency: 95.1 MHz
- Branding: The Eagle

Programming
- Format: Talk radio

Ownership
- Owner: Duran-Hill, Inc.

Technical information
- Licensing authority: FCC
- Facility ID: 41114
- Class: C1
- ERP: 7,700 watts
- HAAT: 472 meters (1,549 ft)
- Transmitter coordinates: 32°51′47″N 108°14′28″W

Links
- Public license information: Public file; LMS
- Website: knuwfm.com

KNUW is a radio station airing a talk format licensed to Santa Clara, New Mexico, broadcasting on 95.1 FM. The station serves the Silver City, New Mexico area and most of Grant County, New Mexico, and is owned by Duran-Hill, Inc.
