= XHRTO-FM =

Radio station in Felipe Carrillo Puerto, Quintana Roo, Mexico

- Felipe Carrillo Puerto, Quintana Roo; Mexico
- Frequency: 100.5 FM
- Branding: La Estrella Maya Que Habla

Ownership
- Owner: Sebastián Uc Yam

History
- First air date: March 22, 2000
- Call sign meaning: Felipe Carrillo PueRTO

Technical information
- Licensing authority: CRT
- Class: A
- ERP: 3 kW
- HAAT: 91.60 m

XHRTO-FM is a noncommercial radio station on 100.5 FM in Felipe Carrillo Puerto, Quintana Roo, in Mexico. It is known as La Estrella Maya Que Habla and owned by Sebastián Uc Yam, the ex-mayor of Felipe Carrillo Puerto. It is co-owned, but currently not commonly operated, with XHECPQ-FM 102.1.

== History ==
XHRTO was permitted on March 22, 2000, and originally operated as a "combo" FM for XECPQ-AM 720. XHYAM joined the family in 2013 but took more than two years to get to air.

In October 2013, a grenade attack forced XHECPQ-XHRTO off air. The stations were destroyed and later rebuilt.

In 2013, the station was being operated by the Navarro brothers from Chetumal.

In November 2014, La Estrella Maya Que Habla ceased carriage of the Primera Edición morning newscast from MVS Radio, featuring Carmen Aristegui, five months before MVS removed Aristegui from the program.

In November 2018, XHECPQ broke from the simulcast with XHRTO and XHYAM and became a separately programmed station under another commercial operator. 102.1 had previously been operated by the Navarro brothers from Chetumal as a commercial station in 2013.
