= XHPTOM-FM =

Radio station in Puerto Morelos–Cancún, Quintana Roo, Mexico

- Puerto Morelos, Quintana Roo; Mexico
- Frequency: 100.3 MHz (HD Radio)
- Branding: Grupo Cantón Radio

Programming
- Format: Pop

Ownership
- Owner: Carlos de Jesús Aguirre Gómez; (AGC Radio Sureste 2, S.A. de C.V. (pending sale to Grupo Cantón))
- Operator: Grupo Cantón
- Sister stations: XHPPLY-FM Playa del Carmen

History
- First air date: January 2019
- Call sign meaning: PuerTO Morelos

Technical information
- Licensing authority: CRT
- Class: A
- ERP: 2.5 kW
- HAAT: 88.1 m (289 ft)
- Transmitter coordinates: 20°57′21.58″N 86°52′02.82″W

Links
- Website: https://grupocantonradio.com/

XHPTOM-FM is a Mexican radio station on 100.3 FM in Puerto Morelos, Quintana Roo, Mexico, with studios in Cancún. It is owned by Carlos de Jesús Aguirre Gómez is operated by Grupo Radio Cantón and carries its Pop format..

== History ==
XHPTOM was awarded in the IFT-4 radio auction of 2017 on a rebound after the initial winning bidder, La Mera en Playa, failed to pay the winning 42 million peso bid for this frequency. The winning bid by a consortium of Carlos de Jesús Aguirre Gómez and CJAguirre Nacional, S.A.P.I. de C.V., was 11.5 million pesos.
