= KULA-LP =

Radio station in Ili'ili, American Samoa

Ili'ili, American Samoa; American Samoa
- Frequency: 95.1 MHz

Programming
- Format: Religious

Ownership
- Owner: Pacific Islands Bible School

History
- First air date: 2004

Technical information
- Licensing authority: FCC
- Facility ID: 132293
- Class: L1
- ERP: 100 watts
- HAAT: 29 meters (95 feet)
- Transmitter coordinates: 14°20′58″S 170°44′42″W

Links
- Public license information: LMS

KULA-LP (95.1 FM) is a radio station licensed to serve Ili'ili, American Samoa. The station is owned by Pacific Islands Bible School. It airs a Religious radio format.

The station was assigned the KULA-LP call letters by the Federal Communications Commission on September 9, 2002.

== Translators ==
Call sign	Frequency	City of license	FID	ERP (W)	Class	FCC info
K256BH	99.1 FM	Central District, American Samoa	155422	11	D	LMS
K273BK	102.5 FM	Eastern District, American Samoa	155434	23	D	LMS
K246AX	97.1 FM	Western District, American Samoa	155406	11	D	LMS
