= WVNI =

Coordinates: 39.231°N 86.378°W

- Nashville, Indiana; United States
- Broadcast area: Bloomington, Indiana
- Frequency: 95.1 MHz
- Branding: Spirit 95

Programming
- Format: Adult Contemporary Christian

Ownership
- Owner: Mid America Radio Group Inc.

History
- First air date: August 9, 1991

Technical information
- Licensing authority: FCC
- Class: A
- ERP: 3,800 watts
- HAAT: 105 meters (344 ft)
- Translator: 107.7 W299BD (Bloomington)

Links
- Public license information: Public file; LMS
- Website: spirit95.com

WVNI (95.1 FM) is a radio station licensed to Nashville, Indiana and serving the Bloomington, Indiana area. The station is owned by Mid America Radio Group Inc. It airs a Christian contemporary radio format.

WVNI has an effective radiated power of 3,800 watts. The station also has a 100 watt FM translator at 107.7 MHz that serves downtown Bloomington and the Indiana University campus.

Operations Manager/AM Host is Jim Webster. The Production Director is Logan Roberson. Former employees include Diana Nuchols, Denise Ray, Kyle Watson, Todd Youmans, Kenny Ray, Sharon Porter Phillips, Greg Snyder, John Shean & Joey Krol
