= Sistema Quintanarroense de Comunicación Social =

State broadcaster of the Mexican state of Quintana Roo

The Sistema Quintanarroense de Comunicación Social (SQCS, English: Quintana Roo Social Communication System) is the state broadcaster of the Mexican state of Quintana Roo, founded on January 30, 1985. It operates several television and radio stations in the state.

== Radio ==
The SQCS entered radio with a three-station AM network, with transmitters at Chetumal, Cancún and Felipe Carrillo Puerto broadcasting on 860 kHz. The first of the three to come to air was XECTL-AM "Radio Chetumal", still in operation, which signed on May 4, 1985. XECCN-AM 860 in Cancún, known as Radio Caribe, took to the air on June 24 that year, and the radio service extended to Felipe Carrillo Puerto with Radio Chan Santa Cruz XECPR-AM the next year. The SQCS later added a fourth AM station when it built Radio Riviera XERRIV-AM 1180 in Playa del Carmen. XECCN and XERRIV no longer operate.

The state government obtained permits for new FM services in 2000. XHCBJ-FM 106.7 Cancún, branded as Caribe FM, signed on for the first time on October 9, 2000. It was joined on September 24, 2001, by XHCHE-FM 100.9 Chetumal and on October 3, 2002, by XHPYA-FM Playa del Carmen "Riviera FM".

As part of a major power hike from 1,000 to 30,000 watts, XECPR moved from 860 to 660 kilohertz in 2000. In 2005, the Cancún radio tower was blown down by Hurricane Wilma; XHCBJ operated on low power for twelve years until its frequency change to 101.9 MHz on February 5, 2018. The frequency change was carried out in order to clear 106-108 MHz as much as possible for community and indigenous radio stations.

SQCS currently operates five radio services, including two AM and three FM stations:

Callsign	Frequency	City	Power
XECPR-AM	660	Felipe Carrillo Puerto	30 kW (day)
XECTL-AM	860	Juan Sarabia/Chetumal	10 kW (day); 1 kW (night)
XHCBJ-FM	101.9	Cancún	50 kW
XHCHE-FM	100.9	Chetumal	50 kW
XHPYA-FM	98.1	Playa del Carmen	50 kW

== Television ==
Like many state networks, public television in Quintana Roo grew as a byproduct of local optouts from the Instituto Mexicano de la Televisión (Imevisión). Beginning in 1984, local programming began airing for 30 minutes a day on the Imevisión transmitter in Chetumal. In 1985, after the creation of the SQCS, these programs began to be carried statewide, and the next year, the local opt-out was expanded to an hour.

On July 25, 1986, XHLQR-TV channel 7 (plus offset) took to the air in Chetumal, known as Siete Más Televisión. It currently broadcasts on three transmitters, in Felipe Carrillo Puerto, Cancún and Chetumal.

RF	VC	Call sign	Location	ERP
34	4	XHNQR-TDT	Cancún	59.59 kW
34	4	XHLQR-TDT	Chetumal	67.4 kW
28	4	XHFCQ-TDT	Felipe Carrillo Puerto	.100 kW

All SQCS transmitters are assigned virtual channel 4.

At its height, SQCS had five analog transmitters: Felipe Carrillo Puerto, Cancún, Chetumal, Playa del Carmen and José María Morelos.

While SQCS does broadcast local programming including a statewide newscast, it primarily retransmits the national educational and cultural programming of Canal Once under an agreement with that network that has been in place since 1991.
