= XHROOC-FM =

Radio station in Chetumal, Quintana Roo, Mexico

- Chetumal, Quintana Roo; Mexico
- Frequency: 101.7 FM
- Branding: La Guadalupana

Programming
- Format: Regional Mexican

Ownership
- Owner: Grupo SIPSE Radio; (La Voz de Quintana Roo, S.A. de C.V.)
- Sister stations: XHROO-FM

History
- First air date: 1964 (on 960 AM)
- Call sign meaning: Quintana ROO Chetumal (C added during AM-FM migration)

Technical information
- Licensing authority: CRT
- Class: B1
- ERP: 15 kW
- HAAT: 98.77 m
- Transmitter coordinates: 18°31′10.54″N 88°17′14.45″W

Links
- Webcast: Listen live
- Website: sipseplay.com

XHROOC-FM is a radio station on 101.7 FM in Chetumal, Quintana Roo. It is owned by Grupo SIPSE Radio and carries a Regional Mexican format known as La Guadadalupana.

== History ==
XEROO-AM 960 received its concession in March 1964.

Upon its migration to FM, which occurred in 2011, the letter C was added to the callsign, to avoid having any conflicts with its sister station XHROO-FM 95.3.
