= WJHV-LP =

- Fairbury, Illinois; United States
- Broadcast area: Bloomington
- Frequency: 95.1 MHz

Ownership
- Owner: Faith Fellowship Ministries, Inc.

Technical information
- Licensing authority: FCC
- Facility ID: 126528
- Class: L1
- ERP: 47 watts
- HAAT: 43.3 meters (142 ft)
- Transmitter coordinates: 40°44′50.00″N 88°30′56.00″W

Links
- Public license information: LMS

WJHV-LP (95.1 FM) is a radio station licensed to Fairbury, Illinois, United States, and serving the Bloomington area. The station is currently owned by Faith Fellowship Ministries, Inc.
