= XHECPQ-FM =

Radio station in Felipe Carrillo Puerto, Quintana Roo, Mexico

- Felipe Carrillo Puerto, Quintana Roo; Mexico
- Frequency: 102.1 FM
- Branding: Retro

Programming
- Format: Classic hits

Ownership
- Owner: Sebastián Uc Yam
- Operator: Grupo Sol Corporativo

History
- First air date: October 25, 1985 (concession); 2012 (FM)
- Call sign meaning: Felipe Carrillo Puerto Quintana Roo

Technical information
- Licensing authority: CRT
- Class: AA
- ERP: 6 kW
- HAAT: 97.11 m
- Transmitter coordinates: 19°33′03″N 88°02′35″W

Links
- Webcast: Listen live
- Website: solquintanarooradio.fm

XHECPQ-FM is a radio station on 102.1 FM in Felipe Carrillo Puerto, Quintana Roo, Mexico. It is owned by Sebastián Uc Yam, the ex-mayor of Felipe Carrillo Puerto, and currently operated by Grupo Sol Corporativo as a Classic hits format station known as Retro.

== History ==
XECPQ-AM 1460 received its concession on October 25, 1985. The 1 kW daytimer later moved to 720 kHz by 2000, and then to FM in 2012. In 2000, Uc Yam received the permit for a sister station, XHRTO-FM 100.5, which originally operated as a "combo" FM for XECPQ.

In October 2013, a grenade attack forced XHECPQ-XHRTO off air. The stations were destroyed and later rebuilt.

In 2013, the station was being operated by the Navarro brothers from Chetumal.

In November 2014, La Estrella Maya Que Habla ceased carriage of the Primera Edición morning newscast from MVS Radio, featuring Carmen Aristegui, five months before MVS removed Aristegui from the program. In 2018, Luna Medios, which operates XHQAA-FM Chetumal, took over operations of XHECPQ-FM, with La Estrella Maya Que Habla returning to 100.5 only. The station is now known as Retro.
