= CIMB-FM =

- Pessamit, Quebec; Canada
- Frequency: 95.1 MHz
- Branding: Radio Ntetemuk

Programming
- Format: First Nations community radio

Ownership
- Owner: Radio Ntetemuk Inc.

History
- First air date: August 21, 1981

Technical information
- ERP: 1 watt
- HAAT: 14 metres (46 ft)
- Transmitter coordinates: 48°56′16″N 68°39′17″W

Links
- Website: ntetemuk.com

CIMB-FM is a First Nation community radio station that operates at 95.1 FM in Pessamit, Quebec.

The station is owned by Radio Ntetemuk.

== History ==
The radio station originally dates back to 1982 which Radio Ntetemuk Inc. received CRTC approval on April 27 of that year to operate a new FM native community radio licence on 95.1 MHz with a power of .6 watts in Betsiamites (now Pessamit), that would broadcast 15% French and 86% in the Montagnais language.

On July 30, 2021, the CRTC approved Radio Ntetemuk's application to operate an Innu-, French- and English-language Indigenous (Type B Native) FM radio station in Pessamit, Quebec.
