= KBOE-FM =

- Oskaloosa, Iowa; United States
- Frequency: 104.9 MHz
- Branding: KBOE 104.9 FM Hot Country

Programming
- Format: Country
- Affiliations: ABC News

Ownership
- Owner: Jomast Corporation
- Sister stations: KMZN

History
- First air date: 1964

Technical information
- Licensing authority: FCC
- Facility ID: 31909
- Class: C2
- ERP: 50,000 watts
- HAAT: 150 metres (490 feet)
- Transmitter coordinates: 41°19′15″N 92°38′45″W

Links
- Public license information: Public file; LMS
- Webcast: Listen Live
- Website: kboeradio.com

KBOE-FM (104.9 FM) is a commercial radio station licensed to serve the community of Oskaloosa, Iowa. The station primarily broadcasts a country music format. KBOE-FM is owned by Jomast Corporation.

KBOE-FM provides live coverage of William Penn Statesmen, Oskaloosa Indian and Sigourney Savages sports events as well as coverage of Iowa Hawkeye sports, NASCAR racing and local racing from the Southern Iowa Speedway.

The transmitter and broadcast tower are located north of town at the intersection of Hwy 63 and 230th Street. According to the Antenna Structure Registration database, the tower is 149.4 m (490 ft) tall with the FM broadcast antenna mounted at the 142 m (466 ft) level. The calculated Height Above Average Terrain is 150 m (490 ft). The tower is also used as the antenna system for its sister station, KMZN (AM).
