= KALH-LP =

- Alamogordo, New Mexico; United States
- Broadcast area: Alamogordo, La Luz, Tularosa, Holloman Air Force Base New Mexico
- Frequency: 95.1 MHz
- Branding: Krazy KALHRadio.org "The Soundtrack of Your Life"

Programming
- Format: Variety
- Affiliations: USA Radio Network

Ownership
- Owner: Southwestern Trails Cultural Heritage Association
- Operator: 2nd Life Media

History
- First air date: 2006

Technical information
- Licensing authority: FCC
- Facility ID: 134603
- Class: L1
- ERP: 100 watts
- HAAT: −64.9 meters (−213 ft)
- Transmitter coordinates: 32°56′44″N 105°56′47″W

Links
- Public license information: LMS
- Webcast: Listen Live

KALH-LP (95.1 FM, "Variety 95.1 FM") is a low-power FM radio station broadcasting a variety format. Licensed to Alamogordo, New Mexico, United States, the station is currently owned by Southwestern Trails Cultural Heritage Association.

== History ==
The Federal Communications Commission issued a construction permit for the station on August 24, 2004. The station was assigned the KALH-LP call sign on September 14, 2004, and was granted its license to cover on January 6, 2006. KALH was named Country Station of the Year (2012) by New Music Weekly Magazine (Nashville).

KALH Radio was founded in 2004 by Ken Bass. His mission to provide the community with the news they needed to know. He passed on March 27, 2021. His family controlled the board of directors of the nonprofit holding company until December 27, 2022. A new board of directors took control of the nonprofit under the leadership of Coach Rene Sepulveda as Chairman of the Board, with a focus on expanding community outreach, having student involvement, main street business involvement of Alamogordo's New York Avenue and Tularosa's Granada Avenue Cultural Arts Districts and with a greater a focus on arts, culture and community heritage.

The station leadership transitioned on January 27, 2022, to a new board of directors and new management. Local news was rebranded from Spectrum news to the Alamogordo Town News radio edition sponsored by AlamogordoTownNews.org. The station is now located in Alamogordo's historic New York Avenue with at Studio Q, at 1209 New York Avenue Alamogordo, New Mexico. The station transitioned from an LP station to a streaming station in 2023.

The station branding KALHRadio.org Krazy KALH Radio and the media brand plus NM filed trademarks for AlamogordoTownNews.org, NewMexicoConservativeNews.com, 4thVoice.com and a publishing business in addition to the streaming radio station is liscened to STCHA. Branding only, is owned by 2nd Life Media Inc. 2nd Life Media Inc has no involvement in content creation. Content creation and all operations of the media entity is via SOUTHWESTERN TRAILS CULTURAL HERITAGE ASSOCIATION, INC. STCHA is exclusively and solely responsible for all operations and content creation. Radio personality Anthony Lucero is the primary radio personality and newscaster hailing from the USA Network. The operation is under the direction of General Manager, Chris Edwards. The station remains a nonprofit 501C4 community streaming station with a focus on community affairs, student education and historic preservation.

KALH-LP 95.1 rebranded in May 2023 doing away with the country format and repositioned itself from country to 70s, 80s and 90s variety with the tagline KRAZY KALHRadio.org "The Soundtrack of Your Life." The company rebranding included a logo change and a conversion to an internet streaming radio station converting from an FM format approved by the nonprofit board of directors in May 2023.
