= XHPCHQ-FM =

Radio station in Chetumal, Quintana Roo

- Chetumal, Quintana Roo; Mexico
- Frequency: 91.3 FM
- Branding: Haahil FM

Ownership
- Owner: Grupo Turquesa; (Empresa Turquesa, S.A. de C.V.)
- Sister stations: XHNUC-FM

History
- First air date: January 11, 2019
- Call sign meaning: Chetumal, Quintana Roo

Technical information
- Licensing authority: CRT
- Class: B1
- ERP: 16.195 kW
- HAAT: 129.2 m (424 ft)
- Transmitter coordinates: 18°32′38.75″N 88°16′15.08″W

XHPCHQ-FM is a Mexican radio station on 91.3 FM in Chetumal, Quintana Roo. It is owned by Grupo Turquesa and known as Haahil FM.

== History ==
XHPCHQ was awarded in the IFT-4 radio auction of 2017 and was the only one of three Chetumal frequencies that was ultimately won in the auction. Grupo Turquesa paid 41.4 million pesos. The station signed on January 11, 2019.
