= XHCAQ-FM =

Radio station in Cancún, Quintana Roo

XECAQ-AM/XHCAQ-FM
- Puerto Morelos/Cancún, Quintana Roo; Mexico
- Broadcast area: Cancún
- Frequencies: 740 kHz; 92.3 MHz
- Branding: Radio Fórmula

Programming
- Format: News/talk

Ownership
- Owner: Radio Fórmula; (Transmisora Regional Radio Fórmula, S.A. de C.V.)
- Sister stations: XHPTUL-FM Tulum

History
- First air date: July 25, 1994 (concession); November 1994 (FM)
- Call sign meaning: CAncún Quintana Roo

Technical information
- Licensing authority: CRT
- Class: AM: B FM: B1
- Power: 20 kW day/10 kW night
- ERP: 10 kW
- HAAT: 62.3 m (204 ft)

XHCAQ-FM 92.3/XECAQ-AM 740 is a in Mexican combo radio station in Cancún, Quintana Roo. It is owned by and carries the Radio Fórmula network.

740 AM is a Canadian clear-channel frequency, on which CFZM in Toronto, Ontario is the dominant Class A station. XECAQ-AM must reduce nighttime power in order to prevent interference to the skywave signal of CFZM.

== History ==
XECAQ received its first concession on July 25, 1994. It was originally owned by Norma Campillo González and broadcast on 1080 kHz. That November, the station was authorized for its FM combo, XHCAQ-FM 92.3. In 1998, Radio Fórmula bought the station.
