= WFLE-FM =

- Flemingsburg, Kentucky; United States
- Frequency: 95.1 MHz
- Branding: Hot Country

Programming
- Format: Country music
- Affiliations: Fox News Radio, Jones Radio Network, Motor Racing Network

Ownership
- Owner: Dreamcatcher Communications, Inc.

History
- Former call signs: DWFLE-FM (1994–1994)

Technical information
- Licensing authority: FCC
- Facility ID: 21719
- Class: A
- ERP: 2,350 watts
- HAAT: 161.0 meters
- Transmitter coordinates: 38°24′42″N 83°34′41″W

Links
- Public license information: Public file; LMS
- Webcast: Listen Live

WFLE-FM (95.1 FM) is a radio station broadcasting a country music format. Licensed to Flemingsburg, Kentucky, United States, the station is currently owned by Dreamcatcher Communications, Inc. and features programming from Fox News Radio, Jones Radio Network and Motor Racing Network.

== History ==
The station went on the air as WFLE-FM on 1994-02-14. On 1994-02-28, the station changed its call sign to the current WFLE, and on 1994-03-07, to the current WFLE,
