= XHCANQ-FM =

Radio station in Cancún, Quintana Roo

- Cancún, Quintana Roo; Mexico
- Frequency: 102.7 FM
- Branding: TurquesaPop

Programming
- Format: Contemporary hit radio

Ownership
- Owner: Grupo Turquesa; (Gaston Alegre López)
- Sister stations: XHNUC-FM

History
- First air date: 1994
- Former frequencies: 1100 kHz
- Call sign meaning: Cancún, Quintana Roo (Q added during AM-FM migration)

Technical information
- Licensing authority: CRT
- Class: B1
- ERP: 10 kW
- HAAT: 119.8 m (393 ft)
- Transmitter coordinates: 21°08′44.36″N 86°53′16.44″W

Links
- Website: 102.radioturquesa.fm

XHCANQ-FM 102.7 is a noncommercial radio station in Mexico, in Santa Martha, Cancún, Quintana Roo, known as TurquesaPop. It is owned by Grupo Turquesa and It was founded by Gaston Alegre López, a longtime radio entrepreneur, hotel owner, and PRD politician in the state.

== History ==
XECAN-AM 1100 took to the air in 1994.

Upon migration to FM, its call sign became XHCANQ-FM, as there is already an XHCAN-FM.
