= KTKS =

- Versailles, Missouri; United States
- Broadcast area: Eldon, Missouri; Lake of the Ozarks
- Frequency: 95.1 MHz
- Branding: KS-95

Programming
- Format: Country music

Ownership
- Owner: Dennis Benne; (Benne Broadcasting of Versailles, LLC)

Technical information
- Licensing authority: FCC
- Facility ID: 68605
- Class: C3
- ERP: 12,500 watts
- HAAT: 141 meters (463 ft)
- Transmitter coordinates: 38°24′32″N 92°45′43″W

Links
- Public license information: Public file; LMS
- Webcast: Listen live
- Website: lakeradio.com

KTKS is a country music radio station licensed to Versailles, Missouri and broadcasting on 95.1 FM. The station is owned by Dennis Benne, through licensee Benne Broadcasting of Versailles, LLC.
