= WHMT =

- Tullahoma, Tennessee; United States
- Frequency: 740 kHz
- Branding: Whiskey Country

Programming
- Format: Country

Ownership
- Owner: Peter Bowman; (Bowman Broadcasting, LLC)

History
- First air date: 1947
- Former call signs: WKQD (1986–1988); WDFZ (1988–1992); WJIG (1992–2010)
- Call sign meaning: WHMT

Technical information
- Licensing authority: FCC
- Facility ID: 49836
- Class: D
- Power: 250 watts day 11 watts night
- Transmitter coordinates: 35°20′36.00″N 86°12′0.00″W
- Translators: 95.9 W240EF (Shelbyville); 105.1 W286BG (Tullahoma)

Links
- Public license information: Public file; LMS
- Website: whiskeycountryradio.com

WHMT (740 AM, "Whiskey Country") is a radio station broadcasting a country music format. Licensed to Tullahoma, Tennessee, United States, the station is currently owned by Josh and Holly Peterson, through licensee Peterson Media Group (Coffee County Broadcasting Inc). The station is named for its close proximity to prominent whiskey Distilleries in the area.
