= XHYI-FM =

Radio station in Cancún, Quintana Roo, Mexico

XHYI-FM / XEYI-AM
- Cancún, Quintana Roo; Mexico
- Broadcast area: Cancún, Quintana Roo
- Frequencies: 93.1 MHz; 580 kHz
- Branding: Mix

Programming
- Format: Adult hits

Ownership
- Owner: Grupo ACIR; (Radio XHYI, S. de R.L. de C.V.)

History
- First air date: January 17, 1980 (concession); 1994 (FM)

Technical information
- Licensing authority: CRT
- Class: B1 (FM); C (AM)
- Power: 1 kW day/0.25 kW night
- ERP: 10 kW
- HAAT: 5.8 m (19 ft) FM)

Links
- Webcast: Listen live
- Website: mixfm.mx

XHYI-FM 93.1/XEYI-AM 580 is a combo radio station in Cancún, Quintana Roo, Mexico. It is owned by Grupo ACIR and carries its Mix adult hits format.

== History ==
XEYI received its first concession on January 17, 1980. It was owned by Ricardo López Méndez. In 1993, the concession was transferred to Radiodifusora Comercial XEYI, S.A. de C.V., and the next year, the station became an AM-FM combo.

In 2000, the concession was transferred to Radio Integral as part of a consolidation of concessions held by Grupo ACIR.
