= XHZCM-FM =

Radio station in Cozumel, Quintana Roo

- Cozumel, Quintana Roo; Mexico
- Frequency: 103.9 MHz
- Branding: La Voz del Caribe

Ownership
- Owner: Patronato Pro-Televisión de Cozumel, A.C.
- Sister stations: XHCOZ-TV

History
- First air date: August 1, 2012 (permit)
- Former frequencies: 107.7 MHz (2012–2024)
- Call sign meaning: Anagram of Cozumel

Technical information
- Licensing authority: CRT
- Class: AA
- ERP: 6 kW
- HAAT: 24.44 meters
- Transmitter coordinates: 20°30′42.8″N 86°56′43.97″W

Links
- Website: lavozdelcaribe.mx

XHZCM-FM (103.9 MHz) is a social radio station in Cozumel, Quintana Roo, Mexico, known as La Voz del Caribe.

== History ==
The permit for 107.7 FM was issued on August 1, 2012, for Cozumel's second FM radio station, behind XHRB-FM. The station is co-owned with local TV station XHCOZ-TDT.

On November 30, 2024, XHZCM-FM moved from 107.7 MHz to 103.9 MHz. The Federal Telecommunications Institute (IFT) had ordered this change upon renewing XHZCM's concession on December 6, 2023, to clear the 106–108 MHz band for future community and indigenous stations.
