= Farmer City, Illinois =

Farmer City
- City
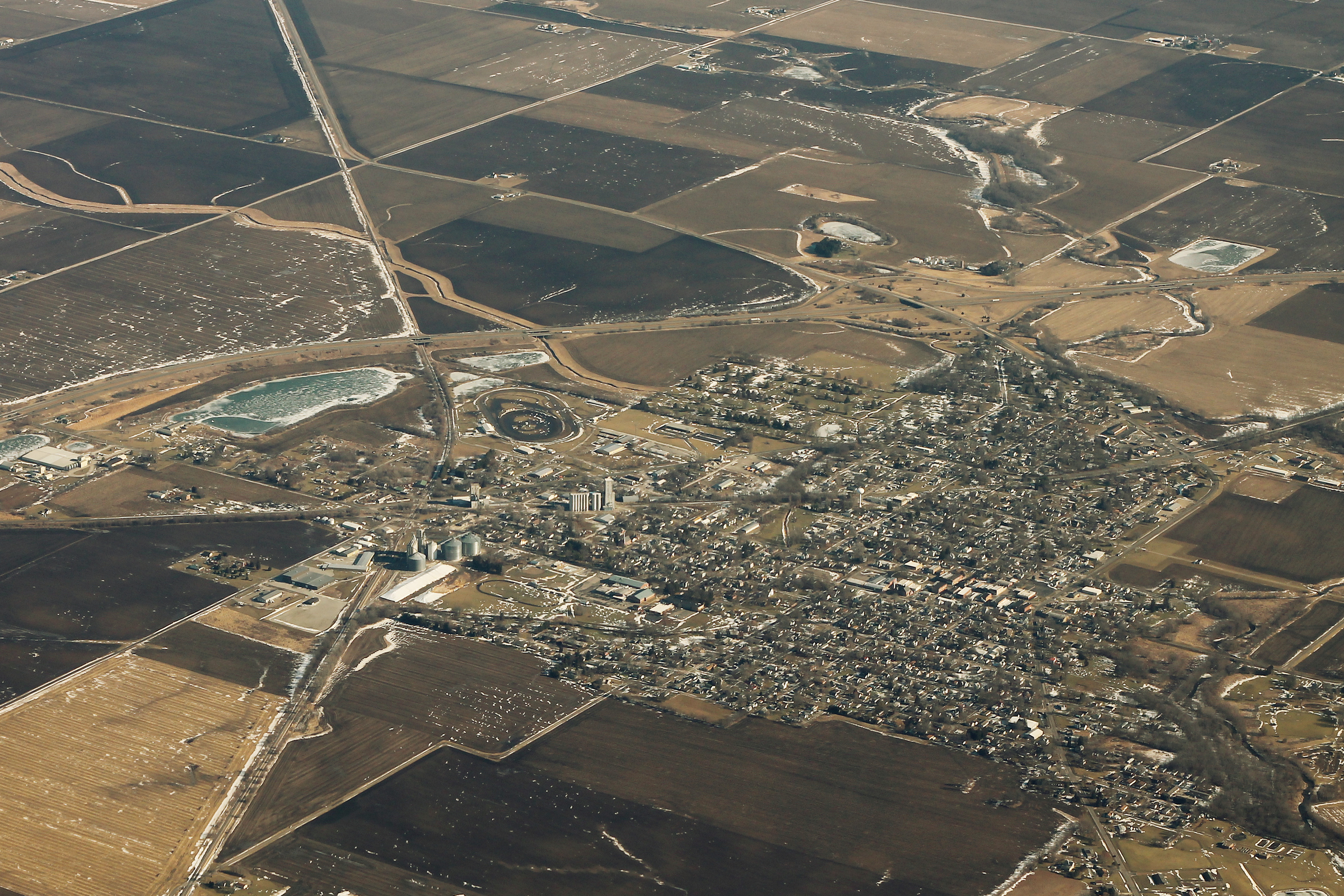
- Aerial view of Farmer City

- Location of Farmer City in De Witt County, Illinois.
- Coordinates: 40°15′03″N 88°37′55″W
- Country: United States
- State: Illinois
- County: DeWitt
- Township: Santa Anna

Area
  - Total: 2.44 sq mi (6.33 km^{2})
  - Land: 2.39 sq mi (6.20 km^{2})
  - Water: 0.046 sq mi (0.12 km^{2})
- Elevation: 715 ft (218 m)

Population (2020)
  - Total: 1,828
  - Density: 763.3/sq mi (294.73/km^{2})
- Time zone: UTC-6 (CST)
  - Summer (DST): UTC-5 (CDT)
- ZIP code: 61842
- Area code: 309
- FIPS code: 17-25414
- GNIS feature ID: 2394744
- Website: cityoffarmercity.org

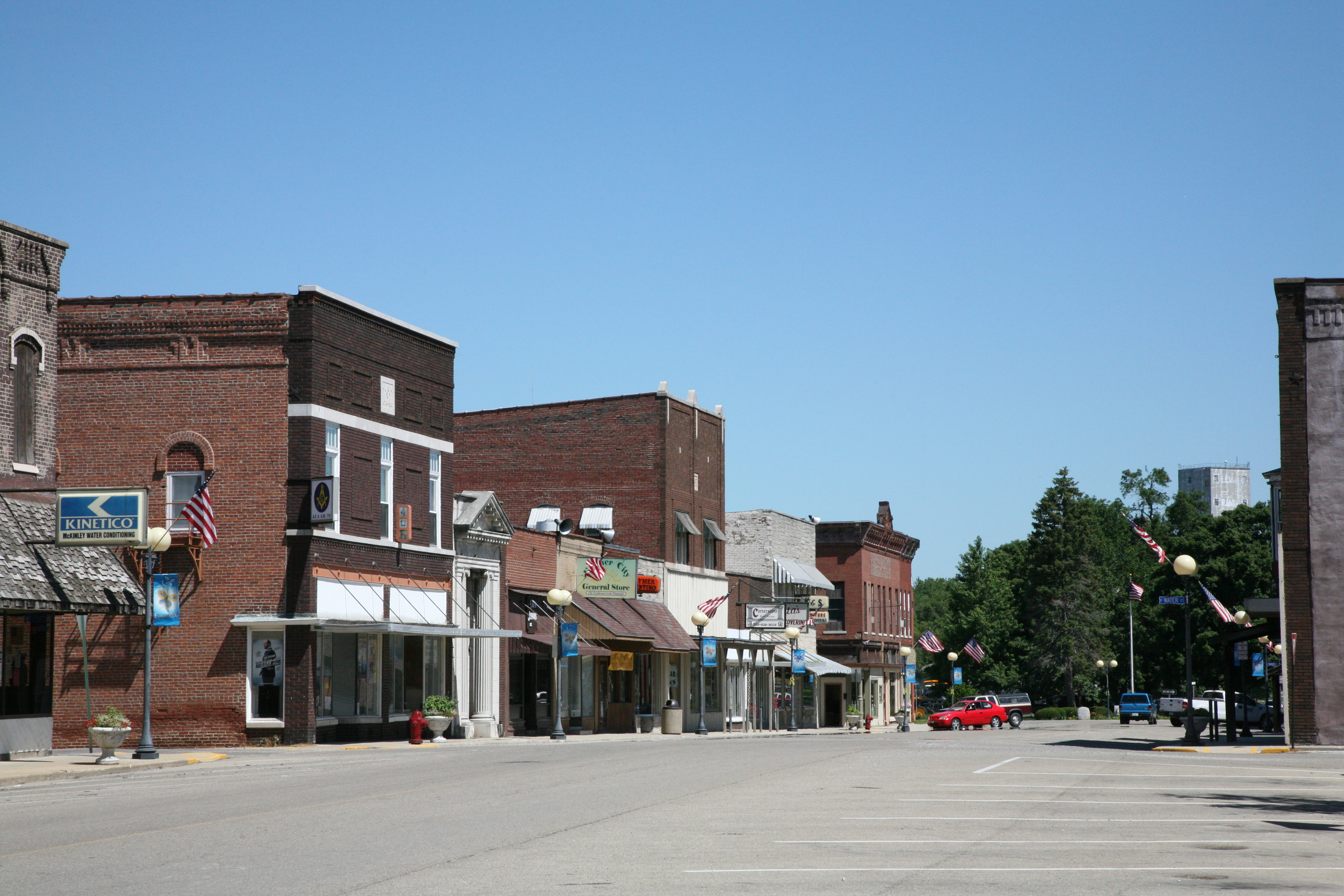
Downtown Farmer City

Farmer City is a city in DeWitt County, Illinois, United States. The population was 1,828 at the 2020 census.

Farmer City is part of Blue Ridge Community Unit School District 18 sharing facilities with nearby Mansfield and Bellflower, Illinois. Farmer City facilities include the District Unit Office, the Ruth M. Schneider Elementary School (K-3) and Blue Ridge High School. On May 30, 2018, the city declared itself a second amendment sanctuary.

== History ==
The Kickapoo and Potawatomi Native American tribes lived on the prairie and woodlands around Salt Creek and other local streams. The westward push of traders and adventurers led to settlers around 1825. Dennis Hurley is believed to be the first white settler in the area. Hurley built a cabin in the area, which became known as Hurley's Grove, with other families settling nearby. Some of the founding families were the Kirbys, McCords, Clearwaters, Watsons, Johnson, Webb, Blalach, Weedmans, Coveys, Cummings, and Huddlestons. Hurley's Grove was just south of present-day Farmer City, with increased population by 1837, becoming part of DeWitt County in 1839.

The area to the south of Hurley's Grove was solidified as a permanent settlement, due to the safety of the area's wooded terrain. North of the primary area became known as Mt. Pleasant. Subdivision of the land divided the area into 14 blocks, with a central public square. The first residence built was that of Nathan Clearwater, and William McFall opened a store in 1837. Mail delivery was established in 1837, but with another Mt. Pleasant in the state, the name changed to Santa Anna.

Dewitt County was part of the Eighth Judicial District in the early 1850s, and lawyer Abraham Lincoln traveled in the area many times on his circuit; he was well respected by county residents. C. H. Moore House in nearby Clinton is the former residence of Lincoln's co-counsel in various cases.

The settlement grew in population and physical size, with the center of activity moving northward. The area became connected in 1870 by rail, prospering; that year's census listed 1276 people in the township, and 537 in Mt. Pleasant. The necessity of an official name arose in 1869, with Farmer City chosen after much discussion and debate. The business district was destroyed in 1879 by a major fire, but the town was rebuilt. The rebuilding process had to be rebooted after an 1894 fire destroyed the new business district.

The early years of the next century saw Farmer City grow into a bustling community. A newspaper, the Public Reaper, first printed on November 27, 1879. City fathers helped usher the area into a modern era, with utilities such as a water tower (1920). The new business district was joined by schools, churches, and fine homes. Interstate 74 was completed in the early 1970s. In 1980, an extensive study of the dialect of Farmer City was completed, making the city well known in the field of sociolinguistics.

== Geography ==
According to the 2010 census, Farmer City has a total area of 2.449 square miles (6.34 km^{2}), of which 2.4 square miles (6.22 km^{2}) (or 98%) is land and 0.049 square miles (0.13 km^{2}) (or 2%) is water.

== Demographics ==
Historical population
Census	Pop.	Note	%±
1870	537		—
1880	1,289		140.0%
1890	1,367		6.1%
1900	1,664		21.7%
1910	1,603		−3.7%
1920	1,678		4.7%
1930	1,621		−3.4%
1940	1,833		13.1%
1950	1,752		−4.4%
1960	1,838		4.9%
1970	2,217		20.6%
1980	2,252		1.6%
1990	2,114		−6.1%
2000	2,055		−2.8%
2010	2,037		−0.9%
2020	1,828		−10.3%
U.S. Decennial Census

=== 2020 census ===
As of the 2020 census, Farmer City had a population of 1,828 and 764 households. The population density was 748.26 inhabitants per square mile (288.90/km^{2}). There were 884 housing units at an average density of 361.85 per square mile (139.71/km^{2}).

The median age was 43.2 years. 21.8% of residents were under the age of 18 and 21.7% of residents were 65 years of age or older. For every 100 females there were 96.8 males, and for every 100 females age 18 and over there were 96.2 males age 18 and over.

0.0% of residents lived in urban areas, while 100.0% lived in rural areas.

Of the 764 households, 25.8% had children under the age of 18 living in them. 46.1% were married-couple households, 21.1% were households with a male householder and no spouse or partner present, and 23.7% were households with a female householder and no spouse or partner present. About 32.9% of all households were made up of individuals and 17.3% had someone living alone who was 65 years of age or older.

There were 884 housing units, of which 13.6% were vacant. The homeowner vacancy rate was 2.9% and the rental vacancy rate was 9.4%.

Racial composition as of the 2020 census
Race	Number	Percent
White	1,718	94.0%
Black or African American	16	0.9%
American Indian and Alaska Native	1	0.1%
Asian	2	0.1%
Native Hawaiian and Other Pacific Islander	2	0.1%
Some other race	6	0.3%
Two or more races	83	4.5%
Hispanic or Latino (of any race)	37	2.0%

=== Income and poverty ===
The median income for a household in the city was $66,591, and the median income for a family was $84,625. Males had a median income of $36,750 versus $31,725 for females. The per capita income for the city was $27,409. About 7.6% of families and 10.6% of the population were below the poverty line, including 17.8% of those under age 18 and 10.0% of those age 65 or over.

== Transportation ==
Interstate 74, which is paralleled by US 150, and State Route 54 intersect near Farmer City. They are paralleled by routes of the Norfolk Southern Railway and Illinois Central Railroad, respectively.

== Education ==
Farmer City is home to Blue Ridge Community Unit School District 18, the sports teams have the nickname “Knights”.

== Media ==
Farmer City is the home of WPEO-FM, an FM radio station broadcasting on a frequency of 98.3 mHz. Its programming consists of Christian radio.

== Notable people ==
- Samuel B. Garver, Illinois state representative, businessman, and farmer, lived in Farmer City.
- Lott R. Herrick, Illinois Supreme Court justice, was born in Farmer City.
- George Rock, singer with the Spike Jones Band production of 'All I Want for Christmas is My Two Front Teeth'
- Vespasian Warner, U.S. Representative 1895–1905, was born in Farmer City.
