= XHCOZ-TDT =

TV station in Cozumel, Quintana Roo

- Cozumel, Quintana Roo; Mexico
- Channels: Digital: 23 (UHF); Virtual: 11
- Branding: 5tv Cozumel

Ownership
- Owner: Patronato Pro-Televisión de Cozumel, A.C.

History
- Founded: February 23, 1990 (permit)
- Former channel numbers: 5 (analog and digital virtual, 1990-2016)
- Former affiliations: Canal Once
- Call sign meaning: Cozumel

Technical information
- Licensing authority: CRT
- ERP: 2 kW
- Transmitter coordinates: 20°30′42″N 86°56′41″W

Links
- Website: tvcozumel.mx

XHCOZ-TDT is a television station in Cozumel, Quintana Roo. Broadcasting on digital channel 23 (mapping to channel 11 using PSIP), XHCOZ is owned locally by the Patronato Pro-Televisión de Cozumel, A.C. and is known as 5tv Cozumel, carrying a locally produced schedule of independent programming.

== History ==
XHCOZ's permit history begins on February 23, 1990, when the Patronato Pro-Televisión de Cozumel, A.C. received a permit to build a television station on channel 5. However, XHCOZ did not come to air for more than 15 years and found itself in problems with its permit. It was renewed in 2006, and on January 17, 2007, nearly 17 years after being awarded, XHCOZ came to air as a full-time repeater of Once TV from the Instituto Politécnico Nacional; the inauguration ceremony was attended by Governor Félix González Canto.

Around 2012, XHCOZ unhooked from Once TV and began full local operations. It carries locally produced news, sports and entertainment programs. The 2010s also saw the station's conversion to digital television and the addition of an FM sister station, XHZCM-FM 107.7.

Despite not having relayed Canal Once in several years, the Federal Telecommunications Institute still listed XHCOZ as a Canal Once repeater and assigned it virtual channel 11 — exclusively awarded to the IPN's own stations — in September 2016.
