= XHRB-FM =

Radio station in Cozumel, Quintana Roo

XHRB-FM / XERB-AM
- Cozumel, Quintana Roo; Mexico
- Frequency: 89.9 (MHz) / 810 (kHz)
- Branding: Sol Stereo

Programming
- Format: Full-service radio

Ownership
- Owner: Grupo Sol Comunicaciones; (Luis Alberto Pavía Mendoza)
- Sister stations: XHWO-FM/XEWO-AM Chetumal

History
- First air date: January, 1986; 1994 (FM)

Technical information
- Licensing authority: CRT
- Class: B1 (FM); B (AM)
- Power: 2,500 watts daytime 250 watts nighttime (AM)
- ERP: 25,000 watts (FM)
- HAAT: 78.40 m

Links
- Website: www.sol899.com

XERB-AM/XHRB-FM is a radio station in Mexico, broadcasting on 810 AM and 89.9 FM in Cozumel, Quintana Roo.

== History ==
The first station to carry the XERB callsign was a border blaster on 1090 kHz in Rosarito Beach, Baja California, which was branded as The Mighty 1090. That station continues to broadcast today with the call sign XEPRS. In 1973, XERB became world-famous when George Lucas featured the station as the source for the musical soundtrack of his motion picture American Graffiti.

The XERB callsign returned in January 1986 on the other end of Mexico, in Cozumel, Quintana Roo, when a concession was issued for 1170 kHz to Luis Alberto Pavía Mendoza. That XERB, which later moved to 810 kHz, is now also on FM as XHRB-FM 89.9. It is known as Sol Stereo.
