= KMZN =

- Oskaloosa, Iowa; United States
- Frequency: 740 kHz
- Branding: KMZN 99.5 FM - 740 AM

Programming
- Format: Classic hits
- Affiliations: ABC News

Ownership
- Owner: Jomast Corporation

History
- First air date: 1950 (as KBOE)
- Former call signs: KBOE (1950–2014)

Technical information
- Licensing authority: FCC
- Facility ID: 31910
- Class: D
- Power: 229 watts (daytime); 10 watts (nighttime)
- Transmitter coordinates: 41°19′15″N 92°38′44″W
- Translators: 99.5 MHz (K258BG - Oskaloosa) (103.9 MHz) K280GT (Sigourney)

Links
- Public license information: Public file; LMS
- Webcast: Listen Live
- Website: radiokmzn.com

KMZN (740 AM) is a commercial radio station licensed to serve the community of Oskaloosa, Iowa. The station primarily broadcasts a classic hits format. KMZN is owned by Jomast Corporation. It was first licensed on January 15, 1951, as KBOE.

740 AM is a Canadian clear-channel frequency on which CFZM in Toronto, Ontario is the dominant Class A station. KMZN must reduce nighttime power to only 10 watts in order to prevent interference to the skywave signal of CFZM.

== Programming ==
KMZN often provides live coverage of William Penn Statesmen & Oskaloosa Indian sports events as well as coverage of Iowa Hawkeye sports, NASCAR racing and area race tracks such as the Southern Iowa Speedway, Eddyville Raceway Park, Eldon Raceway, and Knoxville Raceway.

On August 1, 2015, KMZN dropped its simulcast with KBOE-FM and switched to sports, with programming from CBS Sports Radio.

In January 2017 KMZN changed format from sports to classic hits.

== Previous logo ==
(KMZN's logo under former simulcast with KBOE-FM 104.9)
