= XHOMA-FM =

Radio station in Comala, Colima

- Comala, Colima; Mexico
- Frequency: 102.1 MHz
- Branding: Recuerdo 102.1

Programming
- Format: Spanish adult hits

Ownership
- Owner: Grupo Radiofónico ZER; (Gaia FM, A.C.)

History
- First air date: Late 2013
- Call sign meaning: COMAla

Technical information
- ERP: 3 kW

Links
- Website: XHOMA-FM

XHOMA-FM is a noncommercial radio station in Colima, Colima, licensed to Comala. Broadcasting on 102.1 FM, XHOMA carries a Spanish-language adult hits format known as "Recuerdo 102.1" which is operated by Grupo Radiofónico Zer.

== History ==
The permit for XHOMA was awarded on January 11, 2012, to Gaia FM, A.C. Gaia FM, which also owns permits for stations in Puerto Vallarta, Jalisco, Cancún, Quintana Roo and Playa del Carmen, Quintana Roo, signed XHOMA on late in 2013 with its Pirata FM rock music format, which also airs on its other stations.

In October 2014, XHOMA turned down a completely different path from its sister stations when it temporarily went off the air on October 31 in what Pirata FM officially described as a "pause". On January 17, 2015, however, 102.1 FM returned to the air, this time under the control of Grupo Radiofónico ZER, known for its operation of permit stations as part of its station portfolio. ZER also moved its studios and offices to another building.
