= José María Morelos, Quintana Roo =

José María Morelos
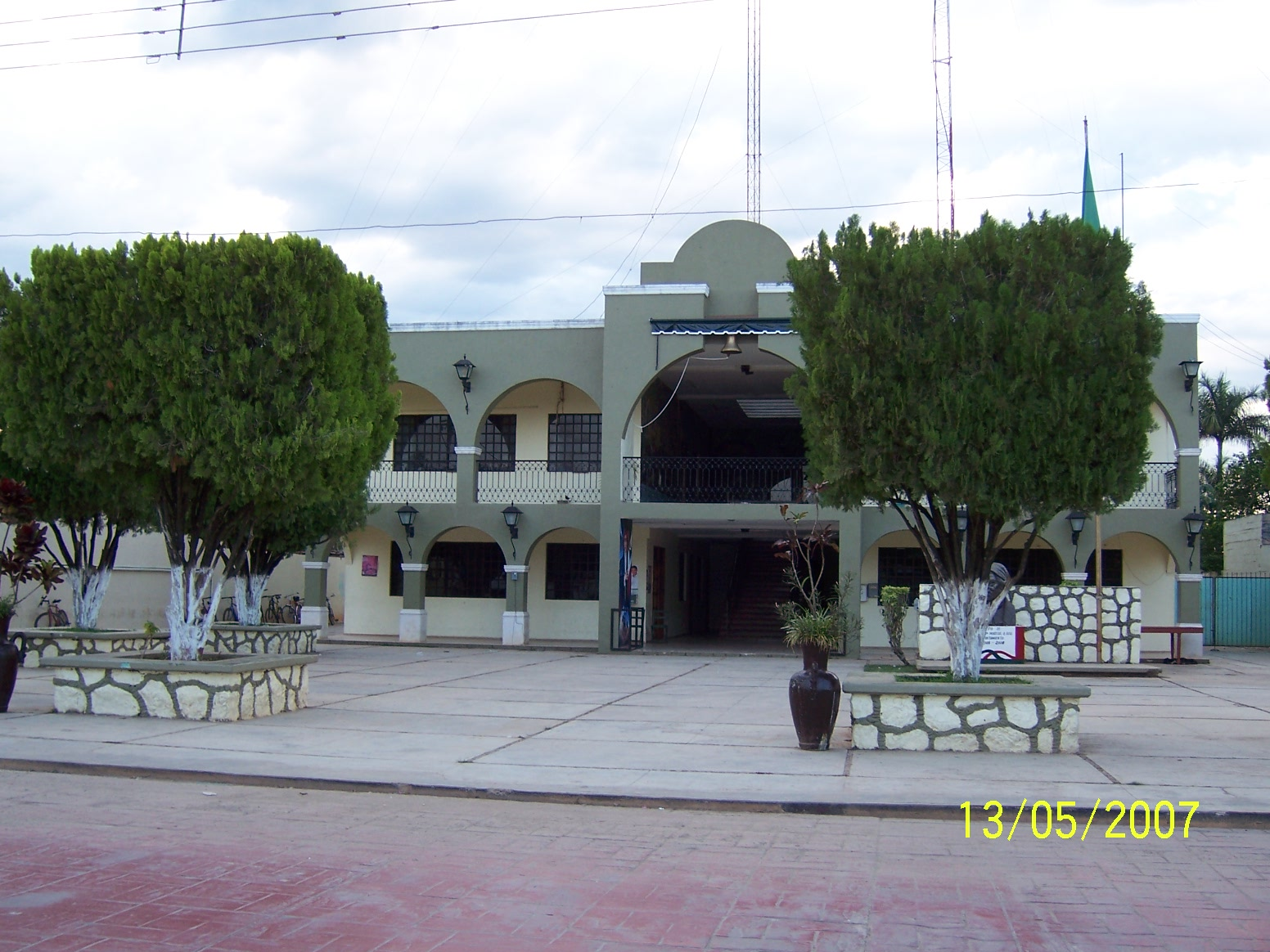
- Jose María Morelos municipal hall

- Location within Mexico
- Coordinates: 19°45′N 88°42′W
- Country: Mexico
- State: Quintana Roo
- Municipality: José María Morelos
- Named for: José María Morelos

Government
  - Municipal President: José Dolores Baladez Chi
- Elevation: 20 m (66 ft)

Population (2010)
  - Total: 11,750
- Time zone: UTC–05:00 (Zona Sureste)
- Website: www.josemariamorelos.gob.mx

José María Morelos is the municipal seat and largest city in José María Morelos Municipality in the Mexican state of Quintana Roo. According to the 2010 census, the city's population was 11,750 persons.

José María Morelos was established in the 19th century with the purpose of exporting wood and chicle. It was originally called Kilómetro 50, since it was 50 kilometres (31 mi) from Peto. When Quintana Roo became a state in 1974, the place was renamed after the revolutionary rebel leader José María Morelos, and it became the seat of the namesake municipality.

The local economy relies largely on agricultural activities, such as livestock raising, beekeeping, and forestry, with key products including sugar cane, corn, honey, and valuable hardwoods.
