= 91.3 FM =

FM radio frequency

The following radio stations broadcast on FM frequency 91.3 MHz:

== Argentina ==
- LRS928 in Esperanza, Santa Fe
- Aire Libre in Rosario, Santa Fe
- Radio María in Buenos Aires
- Radio María in General La Madrid, Buenos Aires
- Radio María in Federación, Entre Ríos
- Radio María in Gualeguay, Entre Ríos
- Radio María in Urdinarrain, Entre Ríos
- Radio María in San Salvador de Jujuy, Jujuy
- Radio María in Río Turbio, Santa Cruz
- Radio María in Esperanza, Santa Fe

== Australia ==
- 3SRR in Mount Buller, Victoria
- C91.3 in Sydney, New South Wales
- 3PNN in Warrnambool, Victoria
- 91.3 SportFM in Fremantle, Western Australia
- Keppel FM in Yeppoon, Queensland

== Canada (Channel 217) ==
- CBD-FM in Saint John, New Brunswick
- CBF-FM-6 in Lac-Megantic, Quebec
- CBTO-FM in Revelstoke, British Columbia
- CBUS-FM in 100 Mile House, British Columbia
- CBXV-FM in Fox Creek, Alberta
- CFBW-FM in Hanover, Ontario
- CFCO-FM in Chatham, Ontario
- CHRM-FM-1 in Les Mechins, Quebec
- CHRZ-FM in Parry Island, Ontario
- CIOG-FM in Charlottetown, Prince Edward Island
- CIRA-FM in Montreal, Quebec
- CJLX-FM in Belleville, Ontario
- CJTR-FM in Regina, Saskatchewan
- CJZN-FM in Victoria, British Columbia
- CKUA-FM-13 in Drumheller, Alberta
- VF2398 in Sundree, Alberta
- VF2490 in Campement Eastmain, Quebec

== Israel ==
- Kan Kol Hamusica in Arabah, Jerusalem and Safed

== Malaysia ==
- Mix in Taping, Perak

== Mexico ==
- XHACE-FM in Mazatlán, Sinaloa
- XHDGD-FM in Victoria de Durango (Ninguno), Durango
- XHEIM-FM in Saltillo, Coahuila
- XHEOB-FM in Pichucalco, Chiapas
- XHEPL-FM in Ciudad Cuauhtémoc, Chihuahua
- XHFAJ-FM in Mexico City
- XHMLS-FM in Matamoros, Tamaulipas
- XHMTM-FM in Montemorelos, Nuevo León
- XHNOE-FM in Nuevo Laredo, Tamaulipas
- XHPAMM-FM in Amatepec, State of Mexico
- XHPCHQ-FM in Chetumal, Quintana Roo
- XHPGSS-FM in Guasave, Sinaloa
- XHPLA-FM in Aguascalientes, Aguascalientes
- XHPT-FM in Córdoba, Veracruz
- XHPTAN-FM in Tantoyuca, Veracruz
- XHSCFM-FM in Cuilápam De Guerrero, Oaxaca
- XHSIAE-FM in Cuetzalan, Puebla
- XHSML-FM in San Miguel de Allende, Guanajuato
- XHSOT-FM in Soto la Marina, Tamaulipas
- XHTY-FM in Tecomán, Colima

== Philippines ==
- DWBA-FM in Santiago City, Isabela
- DWKN-FM in Tabaco City
- DYHC in Balamban, Cebu
- Ka-Alegre FM in Alegria, Cebu
- DYNF in Borongan City
- DXNA in Oroquieta City
- DXRH in Margosatubig, Zamboanga del Sur
- DXVC in Valencia City, Bukidnon

== Singapore ==
- One FM 91.3

== United Kingdom ==
- BBC Radio 3 at Wrotham, Kent
- Raaj FM in Sandwell

== United States (Channel 217) ==
- KACW (FM) in South Bend, Washington
- KAHU in Pahala, Hawaii
- KAKO (FM) in Ada, Oklahoma
- KANP in Ashton, Idaho
- KANV in Olsburg, Kansas
- KAPC in Butte, Montana
- KAQD in Abilene, Texas
- KAWN in Winslow, Arizona
- KAXR in Arkansas City, Kansas
- KAYA in Hubbard, Nebraska
- KBCS in Bellevue, Washington
- KBIA in Columbia, Missouri
- KBKN in Lamesa, Texas
- KBSJ in Jackpot, Nevada
- KCED in Centralia, Washington
- KCPR in San Luis Obispo, California
- KDFR in Des Moines, Iowa
- KDKR in Decatur, Texas
- KDOX in Big Pine, California
- KDRH in King City, California
- KFLF in Somers, Montana
- KFRB in Bakersfield, California
- KGHR in Tuba City, Arizona
- KGLY in Tyler, Texas
- KGTS in College Place, Washington
- KGUY in Guymon, Oklahoma
- KHCK in Houck, Arizona
- KIDE in Hoopa, California
- KIOE in Utulei Village, American Samoa
- KISJ-LP in Bisbee, Arizona
- KKJD in Borrego Springs, California
- KLRY in Gypsum, Colorado
- KLXZ in Ruidoso, New Mexico
- KLZV in Brush, Colorado
- KMHA in Four Bears, North Dakota
- KMHS-FM in Coos Bay, Oregon
- KMSA in Grand Junction, Colorado
- KMSK in Austin, Minnesota
- KNBJ in Bemidji, Minnesota
- KNCM in Appleton, Minnesota
- KNCT-FM in Killeen, Texas
- KNIS in Carson City, Nevada
- KNVE in Redding, California
- KNYR in Yreka, California
- KOAB-FM in Bend, Oregon
- KPAL in Palacios, Texas
- KPKO in Pecos, Texas
- KPRI in Pala, California
- KPVU in Prairie View, Texas
- KRSC-FM in Claremore, Oklahoma
- KRXG in Silver City, New Mexico
- KSCL in Shreveport, Louisiana
- KSHM in Show Low, Arizona
- KSTJ in Hartford, South Dakota
- KSUT in Ignacio, Colorado
- KSUW in Sheridan, Wyoming
- KSVY in Sonoma, California
- KTEQ-FM in Rapid City, South Dakota
- KTLX in Columbus, Nebraska
- KTPF in Salida, Colorado
- KUAF in Fayetteville, Arkansas
- KUCA (FM) in Conway, Arkansas
- KUOP in Stockton, California
- KUSF in Glendale, Oregon
- KUTU in Santa Clara, Utah
- KUWA in Afton, Wyoming
- KUWC in Casper, Wyoming
- KUWS in Superior, Wisconsin
- KUWT in Thermopolis, Wyoming
- KVFM in Beeville, Texas
- KVLU in Beaumont, Texas
- KWTH in Barstow, California
- KWWD in Canadian, Texas
- KWWM in Rock Springs, Wyoming
- KXCI in Tucson, Arizona
- KXNG in Lexington, Nebraska
- KXRP in Bismarck, North Dakota
- KXWT in Odessa, Texas
- KYJC in Commerce, Texas
- KZBV in Carmel Valley, California
- KZES-FM in Estelline, Texas
- KZLV in Lytle, Texas
- WAKJ in DeFuniak Springs, Florida
- WAPS (FM) in Akron, Ohio
- WARN (FM) in Culpeper, Virginia
- WATY in Folkston, Georgia
- WBGP (FM) in Moultrie, Georgia
- WBNB in Equality, Alabama
- WBNY in Buffalo, New York
- WCDJ in Carbondale, Pennsylvania
- WCHW-FM in Bay City, Michigan
- WCKZ in Orland, Indiana
- WCNY-FM in Syracuse, New York
- WCPI in McMinnville, Tennessee
- WCQC in Clarksdale, Mississippi
- WCRD in Muncie, Indiana
- WCSG in Grand Rapids, Michigan
- WCUW in Worcester, Massachusetts
- WDJM-FM in Framingham, Massachusetts
- WDOM in Providence, Rhode Island
- WESM in Princess Anne, Maryland
- WEVH in Hanover, New Hampshire
- WFHB in Bloomington, Indiana
- WFIX in Florence, Alabama
- WFMR (FM) in Orleans, Massachusetts
- WFQS in Franklin, North Carolina
- WGBT in Tomahawk, Wisconsin
- WGJU in East Tawas, Michigan
- WGMR (FM) in Effingham, Illinois
- WGRC in Lewisburg, Pennsylvania
- WGTE-FM in Toledo, Ohio
- WHEM (FM) in Eau Claire, Wisconsin
- WHFG in Broussard, Louisiana
- WHGO in Hertford, North Carolina
- WHHI in Highland, Wisconsin
- WHIF in Palatka, Florida
- WHIL in Mobile, Alabama
- WHJE in Carmel, Indiana
- WHQR in Wilmington, North Carolina
- WIOX in Roxbury, New York
- WIPR-FM in San Juan, Puerto Rico
- WIUM in Macomb, Illinois
- WJCO in Montpelier, Indiana
- WJCZ in Milford, Illinois
- WJOG in Good Hart, Michigan
- WJTG in Fort Valley, Georgia
- WKMS-FM in Murray, Kentucky
- WKNH in Keene, New Hampshire
- WLCH-FM in Lancaster, Pennsylvania
- WLFA in Asheville, North Carolina
- WLMU in Harrogate, Tennessee
- WLRN-FM in Miami, Florida
- WLTR in Columbia, South Carolina
- WLVR-FM in Bethlehem, Pennsylvania
- WMEW in Waterville, Maine
- WMLU in Farmville, Virginia
- WMPN-FM in Jackson, Mississippi
- WNDY (FM) in Crawfordsville, Indiana
- WNGB in Petersham, Massachusetts
- WNIW in La Salle, Illinois
- WNLS in Slidell, Louisiana
- WOES in Ovid-Elsie, Michigan
- WOLN in Olean, New York
- WOLR in Lake City, Florida
- WOUB-FM in Athens, Ohio
- WPAR in Salem, Virginia
- WPDQ in Scottsville, Kentucky
- WPFG in Carlisle, Pennsylvania
- WQLN-FM in Erie, Pennsylvania
- WRLI-FM in Southampton, New York
- WRMW in Peshtigo, Wisconsin
- WRSX in Port Huron, Michigan
- WRTQ in Ocean City, New Jersey
- WSEB in Englewood, Florida
- WSHL-FM in Easton, Massachusetts
- WSJA in York, Alabama
- WSJE in Summersville, West Virginia
- WSLE in Salem, Illinois
- WSTM (FM) in Kiel, Wisconsin
- WTBJ in Oxford, Alabama
- WTSR in Trenton, New Jersey
- WTZY in Wonder Lake, Illinois
- WUKY in Lexington, Kentucky
- WUNH in Durham, New Hampshire
- WVKR-FM in Poughkeepsie, New York
- WVOB in Dothan, Alabama
- WVST-FM in Petersburg, Virginia
- WVUD in Newark, Delaware
- WWDL in Plainfield, Indiana
- WWQI in Morristown, Indiana
- WWUH in West Hartford, Connecticut
- WXAC in Reading, Pennsylvania
- WXLH in Blue Mountain Lake, New York
- WXPL in Fitchburg, Massachusetts
- WXRI in Winston-Salem, North Carolina
- WYEP-FM in Pittsburgh, Pennsylvania
- WYFZ in Belleview, Florida
- WYSO in Yellow Springs, Ohio
- WZMB in Greenville, North Carolina

== Ireland ==
- RTÉ 2fm uses 91.3 MHz FM in the east of Ireland
