= KBFR =

KBFR may refer to:

- KBFR (FM), a radio station (101.1 FM) licensed to serve Desert Center, California, United States
- KBFR (pirate radio), a pirate radio station broadcasting from Boulder, Colorado, United States
- KXRP, a radio station (91.7 FM) licensed to serve Bismarck, North Dakota, United States, which held the call sign KBFR from 2002 to 2014
- Virgil I. Grissom Municipal Airport (ICAO code KBFR)
