= WAMM =

WAMM may refer to:

- WAMM (AM), a radio station (790 AM) licensed to serve Mount Jackson, Virginia, United States
- WSVG (AM), a defunct radio station formerly licensed to serve Woodstock, Virginia, which held the call sign WAMM from 1981 to 2019
- WFLT (1420 AM), a radio station in Flint, Michigan, which held the call sign WAMM from 1955 to 1980
- Sam Ratulangi International Airport, an airport near Manado, Indonesia assigned the ICAO code WAMM
