= WSVG =

WSVG may refer to:

- WSVG (AM), a defunct radio station (1230 AM) formerly licensed to serve Woodstock, Virginia, United States
- WAMM (AM), a radio station (790 AM) licensed to serve Mount Jackson, Virginia, which held the call sign WSVG from 1988 to 2019
- World Series of Video Games
