= WIOZ =

WIOZ can refer to:

- WIOZ (AM), a radio station at 550 AM located in Pinehurst, North Carolina
- WIOZ-FM, a radio station at 102.5 FM located in Southern Pines, North Carolina
