= 550 AM =

AM radio frequency

The following radio stations broadcast on AM frequency 550 kHz, which the Federal Communications Commission classifies as a regional frequency.

== Argentina ==
- La Primera in Neuquén, Neuquén. (still have no call sign assigned)

== Bolivia ==
- CP 153 in La Paz

== Brazil ==
- ZYI-797 in Garanhuns
- ZYL-225 in Cataguazes
- ZYL-263 in Montes Claros
- ZYJ-331 in Curitiba
- ZYK-287 in Santa Cruz do Sul
- ZYK-578 in Cruzeiro
- ZYK-696 in Sertaozinho
- ZYK-902 in São Raimundo Nonato

== Chile ==
- CD-055 in Angol

== Colombia ==
- HJHF in Marinilla
- HJR22 in Santa Marta
- HJR36 in Mitú
- HJZQ in Neiva

== Cuba ==
- CMBV in Wajay

== El Salvador ==
- YSFG in Sonsonate

== Guatemala (Channel 2) ==
- TGRV in San Pedro Sacatepéquez

== Honduras ==
- HRH in Tegucigalpa

== Jamaica ==
- RJR in Montego Bay

== Ecuador ==
- HJHF in Maranilla
- HCGB1 in Quito

== Mexico ==
- XEPL-AM in Cd. Cuauhtémoc, Chihuahua
- XEGNAY-AM in Tepic, Nayarit

== Nicaragua ==
- YNR1 in Chichigalpa

== Paraguay ==
- ZP48 in Marical Estigarribia
- ZP 16 in Ciudad del Este

== Saint Kitts and Nevis ==
- ZIZ in Springfield, Basseterre (Note: ZIZ operates at 555 kHz)

== United Kingdom ==
=== Falkland Islands ===
- VPC in Port Stanley

== United States ==
Call sign	City of license	Facility ID	Class	Daytime power (kW)	Nighttime power (kW)	Transmitter coordinates
KARI	Blaine, Washington	5351	B	5	2.5	48.954167°N 122.743333°W
KBOW	Butte, Montana	7911	B	5	1	45.975°N 112.571667°W
KCRS	Midland, Texas	42015	B	5	1	32.069444°N 102.029444°W
KFRM	Salina, Kansas	25808	D	5	0.11	39.434444°N 97.660278°W
KFYI	Phoenix, Arizona	63918	B	5	1	33.388056°N 112.006111°W
KFYR	Bismarck, North Dakota	41426	B	5	5	46.853333°N 100.543611°W
KLLV	Breen, Colorado	15879	D	1.8		37.183889°N 108.081667°W
KNUI	Wailuku, Hawaii	49956	B	1	1	20.890556°N 156.488889°W
KOAC	Corvallis, Oregon	50587	B	5	5	44.636667°N 123.1925°W
KRAI	Craig, Colorado	72436	B	5	0.5	40.545833°N 107.531111°W
KTRS	Saint Louis, Missouri	20359	B	5	5	38.6625°N 90.128611°W
KTSA	San Antonio, Texas	71087	B	5	5	29.494722°N 98.414444°W (daytime); 29.496111°N 98.415°W (nighttime)
KTZN	Anchorage, Alaska	12967	B	5	5	61.166111°N 149.826111°W
KUZZ	Bakersfield, California	7695	B	5	5	35.340278°N 118.938611°W
WAME	Statesville, North Carolina	63146	D	0.5	0.053	35.793333°N 80.854167°W
WAYR	Fleming Island, Florida	24625	B	5	0.5	30.0725°N 81.79°W
WDEV	Waterbury, Vermont	54866	B	5	1	44.354722°N 72.751944°W
WDUN	Gainesville, Georgia	32976	B	10	2.5	34.335556°N 83.792222°W
WGR	Buffalo, New York	56101	B	5	5	42.769722°N 78.843611°W
WIOZ	Pinehurst, North Carolina	46949	B	1	0.26	35.151111°N 79.477778°W
WKRC	Cincinnati, Ohio	29737	B	5	1	39.008056°N 84.444167°W
WPAB	Ponce, Puerto Rico	53077	B	5	5	17.990833°N 66.63°W
WSAU	Wausau, Wisconsin	41902	B	15	20	44.857222°N 89.586944°W
WSJW	Pawtucket, Rhode Island	67578	B	1	0.5	41.905°N 71.399444°W
WSVA	Harrisonburg, Virginia	39493	B	5	1	38.451111°N 78.908056°W

== Uruguay ==
- CW1 in Colonia del Sacramento

== Venezuela ==
- YVKE in Caracas
