= KNBQ =

KNBQ may refer to:

- KNBQ (FM), a radio station (98.5 FM) licensed to serve Central Park, Washington, United States
- KBFR (FM), a radio station (101.1 FM) licensed to serve Desert Center, California, United States, which held the call sign KNBQ from 2013 to 2015
- KIRO-FM, a radio station (97.3 FM) licensed to serve Tacoma, Washington, which held the call sign KNBQ from 1976 to 1988
- KZTM, a radio station (102.9 FM) licensed to serve McKenna, Washington, which held the call sign KNBQ from 2005 to 2013
