= WPFG =

WPFG may refer to:

- World Police and Fire Games
- WPFG (FM)
