= KUCA =

KUCA or Kuca may refer to:

- KUCA (FM), a radio station (91.3 FM) licensed to Conway, Arkansas, United States
- Kuca (footballer), a Cape Verdean footballer
- Kuća, the Serbo-Croatian name of the 1975 film The House
- Oneida County Airport (ICAO code KUCA)
