= WWRE =

Radio station in Bridgewater, Virginia

- Bridgewater, Virginia; United States
- Broadcast area: Harrisonburg, Virginia–Staunton
- Frequency: 105.1 MHz
- Branding: Rewind 105.1

Programming
- Format: Classic hits

Ownership
- Owner: Saga Communications; (Tidewater Communications, LLC)
- Sister stations: WHBG; WMQR; WQPO; WSIG; WSVA

History
- First air date: March 3, 1989 (as WRDJ-FM)
- Former call signs: WRDJ-FM (1989–1993); WAMM-FM (1993–2002); WJDV (2002–2005); WBHB-FM (2005–2008); WTGD (2008–2015)
- Call sign meaning: "Re"wind

Technical information
- Licensing authority: FCC
- Facility ID: 73935
- Class: A
- ERP: 6,000 watts
- HAAT: 100 meters (330 ft)
- Transmitter coordinates: 38°27′8.4″N 78°54′31.1″W

Links
- Public license information: Public file; LMS
- Webcast: Listen live
- Website: www.rewind1051.com

WWRE (105.1 FM) is a classic hits formatted broadcast radio station licensed to Bridgewater, Virginia, United States, serving Harrisonburg–Staunton area. WWRE is owned by Saga Communications, through licensee Tidewater Communications, LLC.

== History ==
The station first took the call sign WRDJ-FM on March 1, 1989, and officially launched two days later on March 3 with a classic rock format.

=== WAMM 105.1 ===
On November 26, 1993, the call sign was changed from WRDJ-FM to WAMM-FM. The WRDJ callsign was moved to 104.9 FM, located in Roanoke, Virginia, two weeks later on December 15. WAMM-FM flipped its format from classic rock to country, branded as "WAMM 105.1; Great Country, Less Talk". It became a sister station of WAMM (1230 AM), which had also carried a country format at the time.

=== Lite Rock 105.1 ===
WAMM-FM was a sister station of WAMM AM until September 16, 2002, when the call sign was changed to WJDV and the country format was dropped for light adult contemporary, branded as "Lite Rock 105.1".

=== Magic 105.1 ===
On February 7, 2005, WJDV swapped calls and formats with WBHB-FM 96.1, making it an oldies station, branded as "Magic 105.1". The station played music from the 1950s through the 1970s. During its time with the WBHB-FM callsign, the station went through several formats until the call sign was changed to WTGD on December 1, 2008.

==== Classic Hits 105.1 ====
On March 22, 2005, WBHB-FM dropped its "Magic 105.1" branding, and became "Classic Hits 105.1",

==== Classic Rock 105.1 ====
On the night of March 21, 2006, WBHB-FM dropped "Classic Hits 105.1" and became "Classic Rock 105.1".

==== Rock 105.1 ====
On September 20, 2007, WBHB-FM segued from classic rock to active rock, branded as "Rock 105.1". As a rock station, WBHB-FM carried the syndicated radio program Nights with Alice Cooper, which later moved to WACL.

==== Country Legends 105.1 ====
On April 1, 2008, WBHB-FM changed its format from active rock to classic country, branded as "Country Legends 105.1".

=== WTGD ===
M. Belmont Verstandig, Inc. bought the station, which had previously been owned by Verstandig Broadcasting, and on December 1, 2008, WBHB-FM switched its callsign to WTGD.

==== La Grand D ====
A week later on December 9 at midnight, WTGD dropped its classic country format for Spanish Top 40/Regional Mexican, branded as "La Gran D" or in English, "The Great D". This was the first Spanish-language station to broadcast in the Harrisonburg/Staunton market.

==== 105.1 Bob Rocks ====
In mid-March 2010, WTGD returned to active rock as "105.1 Bob Rocks; Harrisonburg's Real Rock Station".

=== Rewind 105.1 ===
On July 31, 2015, WTGD changed its call sign to WWRE, coinciding with the sale of Verstandig Broadcasting of Harrisonburg to Saga Communications at a purchase price of $9.64 million. On August 1, 2015, the station began stunting with an announcement that the station had been "hacked" (like Saga's WREE in Champaign, Illinois, six months earlier) and demanded a list of requests for Harrisonburg businesses and colleges. They demanded "compliance" by the following Monday at 7:00 a.m. Among the requests were for James Madison University to change its name to "Dolley Madison Zinger University" (and to host a pickup basketball game between Ralph Sampson and Dell Curry at the JMU Convocation Center), for all the quilts at the Virginia Quilt Museum to be sewn together into one quilt (to be called "Mega-Quilt"), for George Washington National Forest to be cut down and entirely replaced with cherry trees (saying it was "payback time"), for the Virginia Poultry Growers Cooperative to collect all leftover feathers and make them into a giant pillow, as well as to make a chicken with six thighs (the reason given being the hacker likes chicken thighs), and for all the seats in the John C. Wells Planetarium to be removed and the planetarium to be turned into a giant ballpit. During the "hack", the station stunted with a wide variety of music, from the theme song to Mister Rogers' Neighborhood to beat poetry. At the time promised, at 7:00 a.m. on August 3, 2015, the station's format was flipped back to classic hits as "Rewind 105-1; Upbeat, Fun Music", playing hits from the 1970s through the early 2000s. On the same date and time, sister station WJDV changed to hot adult contemporary.
