= CHRZ-FM =

First Nations community radio station in Wasauksing, Ontario

Coordinates: 45.358°N 80.041°W

- Parry Island, Ontario; Canada
- Frequency: 91.3 FM
- Branding: Rez 91

Ownership
- Owner: Wasauksing Communications Group

Technical information
- Class: A1
- ERP: 60 watts vertical polarization only
- HAAT: -1 metres

Links
- Website: www.rez91.com

CHRZ-FM is a Canadian radio station, broadcasting at 91.3 FM in Wasauksing, Ontario near Parry Sound. Branded as Rez 91, the station airs a First Nations community radio format.

== History ==
It is unknown when the station originally began broadcasting, however, on October 28, 2011, Wasauksing Communications Group applied to operate an English and Ojibwa language Type B native FM radio programming in Wasauksing First Nation. If approved, the station will operate at 91.3 MHz. On May 9, 2012, Wasauksing Communications received a licence from the Canadian Radio-television and Telecommunications Commission (CRTC) to operate a new radio station at Wasauksing First Nation.
