= KLLV =

- Breen, Colorado; United States
- Broadcast area: Four Corners
- Frequency: 550 kHz
- Branding: The Love Country

Programming
- Format: Christian radio

Ownership
- Owner: Daystar Radio, Ltd.

History
- Former call signs: DKLLV (2005–2007)

Technical information
- Licensing authority: FCC
- Facility ID: 15879
- Class: D
- Power: 1,800 watts (day only)
- Transmitter coordinates: 37°11′2″N 108°4′54″W

Links
- Public license information: Public file; LMS
- Website: www.kllvradio.com

KLLV (550 AM) is a radio station broadcasting a Christian radio format. Licensed to Breen, Colorado, United States, the station serves the Four Corners area. The station is currently owned by Daystar Radio, Ltd.

== History ==
The station was assigned the KLLV call letters on May 2, 1983.
