= WIOZ (AM) =

- Pinehurst, North Carolina; United States
- Frequency: 550 kHz
- Branding: WIOZ 550 AM

Programming
- Format: Soft Oldies - Standards
- Affiliations: America's Best Music

Ownership
- Owner: Muirfield Broadcasting, Inc.
- Sister stations: WIOZ-FM

History
- First air date: March 25, 1980; 45 years ago

Technical information
- Licensing authority: FCC
- Facility ID: 46949
- Class: B
- Power: 1,000 watts day 260 watts night
- Transmitter coordinates: 35°9′4″N 79°28′40″W

Links
- Public license information: Public file; LMS

WIOZ (550 AM) is a commercial radio station broadcasting a soft oldies and standards format. It is licensed to Pinehurst, North Carolina, and is owned by Muirfield Broadcasting, Inc. It features programming from Westwood One's "America's Best Music" service.

By day, WIOZ is powered at 1,000 watts. But to protect other stations on 550 AM from interference, it reduces power at night to 260 watts. It uses a directional antenna at all times.

== History ==
The station signed on the air on March 25, 1980. At first, it was a daytimer station, powered at 1,000 watts but required to go off the air at night. In its early years, it had a Top 40 format and was an affiliate of the Mutual Broadcasting System.

WIOZ changed to the "Music of Your Life" adult standards format in 1999. At the same time, its sister station 102.5 WIOZ-FM changed to adult contemporary music. In the 2000s, WIOZ 550 switched to "America's Best Music" radio service for its music programming.

Previous logo
