= WMQR =

Radio station in Broadway, Virginia

- Broadway, Virginia; United States
- Broadcast area: Harrisonburg–Staunton
- Frequency: 96.1 MHz (HD Radio)
- Branding: More 96.1

Programming
- Format: Hot adult contemporary
- Subchannels: HD2: WSVA simulcast (talk)
- Affiliations: Compass Media Networks

Ownership
- Owner: Saga Communications; (Tidewater Communications, LLC)
- Sister stations: WHBG; WQPO; WSIG; WSVA; WWRE

History
- First air date: December 18, 1989
- Former call signs: WLTK (1988–2001); WBHB-FM (2001–2005); WJDV (2005–2015)
- Call sign meaning: "More" (The Q substitutes the O)

Technical information
- Licensing authority: FCC
- Facility ID: 40648
- Class: B1
- ERP: 2,600 watts
- HAAT: 308 meters (1,010 ft)
- Transmitter coordinates: 38°33′50.4″N 78°56′59.1″W

Links
- Public license information: Public file; LMS
- Webcast: Listen live
- Website: www.more961.com

WMQR (96.1 FM) is a hot adult contemporary formatted broadcast radio station licensed to Broadway, Virginia, United States, serving the Harrisonburg–Staunton area. WMQR is owned by Saga Communications, through licensee Tidewater Communications, LLC.

== History ==
The station was first took the callsign WLTK on June 16, 1988, and officially launched on December 18, 1989, carrying a contemporary Christian format, branded as "Light 96".

On August 8, 2001, WLTK swapped call signs and formats with WBHB-FM 103.3, becoming an oldies format, branded as "Magic 96.1". The station played music from the 1950s through the 1970s.

On February 7, 2005, WBHB-FM swapped call signs and formats with WJDV (105.1 FM), becoming a light adult contemporary format, branded as "Lite Rock 96.1". WBHB-FM remained on 105.1 FM until December 1, 2008, when the call sign was changed to WTGD. On September 17, 2007, WJDV changed its branding from "Lite Rock 96.1" to "96.1 Lite FM; Lite Favorites Full of Variety".

Logo used for WJDV from November 23, 2011, until August 3, 2015.

In early November 2011, WJDV changed its branding to "Mix 96-1", though on November 23, the branding was changed again to "A Fresh Mix; Fresh 96-1". Then, on the week of November 28, the station's branding was again switched to simply "96.1 WJDV" with the fresh961.com and 961litefm.com websites redirected to sister WQPO's website. On the week of December 4, the "Fresh 96-1" branding and fresh961.com website were back. During the holiday season, WJDV changed to an all Christmas music format through Christmas Day. During that time, it was known as "Christmas in the Valley".

On July 31, 2015, WJDV changed its call sign to WMQR; the sale of owner Verstandig Broadcasting of Harrisonburg to Saga Communications was closed the same day at a purchase price of $9.64 million. Three days later at 7:00 a.m. on August 3, the station segued from light adult contemporary to hot adult contemporary as "More 96-1; More Music, More Fun". On the same date and time, sister station WTGD changed to classic hits.
