= XHEPL-FM =

Radio station in Ciudad Cuauhtémoc, Chihuahua, Mexico

XHEPL-FM / XEPL-AM
- Ciudad Cuautémoc, Chihuahua; Mexico
- Frequency: 91.3 FM / 550 AM
- Branding: La Súper Estación

Programming
- Format: Variety

Ownership
- Owner: Cesar Aníbal Moreno Salinas

History
- First air date: July 23, 1970 (concession)

Technical information
- Licensing authority: CRT
- Class: B1 (FM); B (AM)
- Power: 5,000 watts
- ERP: 25 kW
- HAAT: 197.3 m (647 ft)
- Transmitter coordinates: 28°24′36″N 106°55′15″W

Links
- Webcast: Listen live
- Website: xhepl.mx

XHEPL-FM/XEPL-AM is a radio station on 91.3 FM and 550 AM in Ciudad Cuautémoc, Chihuahua, Mexico. The station is owned by the Moreno Salinas family and carries a variety format known as La Súper Estación.

== History ==
XHEPL began as XEPL-AM 550. The station was owned by Adolfo Moreno Cortés when it received its concession on July 23, 1970.

It migrated to FM in 2011.
