= WSIG =

Radio station in Mount Jackson, Virginia

- Mount Jackson, Virginia; United States
- Broadcast area: Central and Northern Shenandoah Valley
- Frequency: 96.9 MHz
- Branding: Real Country 96.9 WSIG

Programming
- Format: Classic country

Ownership
- Owner: Saga Communications; (Tidewater Communications, LLC)
- Sister stations: WHBG; WMQR; WQPO; WSVA; WWRE

History
- First air date: October 1988
- Former call signs: WSIG-FM (1987–2004)
- Call sign meaning: from former sister station WSIG (790 AM)

Technical information
- Licensing authority: FCC
- Facility ID: 60105
- Class: B1
- ERP: 4,300 watts
- HAAT: 170 meters (560 ft)
- Transmitter coordinates: 38°36′31.4″N 78°54′6″W

Links
- Public license information: Public file; LMS
- Webcast: Listen live
- Website: www.969wsig.com

WSIG (96.9 FM) is a classic country formatted broadcast radio station licensed to Mount Jackson, Virginia, United States, serving the Central and Northern Shenandoah Valley. WSIG is owned by Saga Communications, through licensee Tidewater Communications, LLC.
