= XHPAMM-FM =

Radio station in Amatepec, State of Mexico, Mexico

- Amatepec, State of Mexico; Mexico
- Frequency: 91.3 FM
- Branding: La Inigualable

Programming
- Format: Grupera

Ownership
- Owner: José Félix Gallegos Hernández

History
- First air date: September 2018
- Call sign meaning: Amatepec, State of Mexico

Technical information
- Class: A
- ERP: 200 watts
- HAAT: 590.9 meters
- Transmitter coordinates: 18°41′23.2″N 100°11′24.72″W

Links
- Webcast: Listen live
- Website: lainigualable913fm.com

XHPAMM-FM is a radio station on 91.3 FM in Amatepec, State of Mexico, known as La Inigualable which carries a Regional Mexican format.

== History ==
XHPAMM was awarded in the IFT-4 radio auction of 2017 and officially came to air in September 2018. It was originally owned by Guillermina Casique Vences, a former federal deputy. On March 1, 2023, the Federal Telecommunications Institute authorized the transfer of XHPAMM-FM's concession to José Félix Gallegos Hernández. Gallegos Hernández had been Amatepec's mayor from 2016 to 2018 and later from 2019 to 2021.
