= WHBG =

Radio station in Harrisonburg, Virginia

- Harrisonburg, Virginia; United States
- Broadcast area: Harrisonburg; Rockingham County
- Frequency: 1360 kHz
- Branding: ESPN Radio 1360AM and 106.9FM

Programming
- Format: Sports
- Affiliations: ESPN Radio

Ownership
- Owner: Saga Communications; (Tidewater Communications, LLC)
- Sister stations: WMQR; WQPO; WSVA; WSIG; WWRE

History
- First air date: August 1956
- Call sign meaning: HarrisonBurG

Technical information
- Licensing authority: FCC
- Facility ID: 72143
- Class: D
- Power: 5,000 watts day; 9 watts night
- Transmitter coordinates: 38°27′4.0″N 78°54′29.0″W
- Translator: 106.9 W295CP (Harrisonburg)

Links
- Public license information: Public file; LMS
- Webcast: Listen Live
- Website: espnharrisonburg.com

WHBG (1360 AM) is a sports formatted broadcast radio station licensed to Harrisonburg, Virginia, United States, serving Harrisonburg and Rockingham County. The station is owned by Saga Communications.

== Translator ==
In addition to the main station, WHBG is relayed by an FM translator to widen its broadcast area.

Call sign	Frequency	City of license	FID	ERP (W)	HAAT	Class	FCC info
W295CP	106.9 FM	Harrisonburg, Virginia	200014	250	110 m (361 ft)	D	LMS
