= XHMTM-FM =

Radio station in Montemorelos, Nuevo León

- Montemorelos, Nuevo León; Mexico
- Frequency: 91.3 FM
- Branding: Pa La Raza 91.3

Programming
- Format: Regional Mexican and Christian radio

Ownership
- Owner: José Armando de la Cruz Rodríguez

History
- First air date: August 5, 2019 (on 91.3)
- Former frequencies: 88.3 FM (as a pirate)
- Call sign meaning: "Montemorelos"

Technical information
- Licensing authority: CRT
- Class: A
- ERP: 2.5 kW
- HAAT: 23.6 m (77 ft)
- Transmitter coordinates: 25°10′59.09″N 99°50′19.1″W

Links
- Website: Pa'La Raza 91.3 FM website

XHMTM-FM is a radio station on 91.3 FM in Montemorelos, Nuevo León. Mexico. The station is owned by José Armando de la Cruz Rodríguez and carries a Regional Mexican and Christian radio programming format under the name Pa La Raza 91.3.

== History ==
Armando de la Cruz filed for a social station in Montemorelos on March 6, 2014. Five years to the day, on March 6, 2019, the Federal Telecommunications Institute in comparative hearing selected the application over a competing bid for the frequency from Fundación Cultural para la Sociedad Mexicana, A.C. de la Cruz's existing Christian pirate station, Radio Libertad, moved from 88.3 to the legal 91.3 on August 5, 2019.

In August, 26, 2026 Radio Libertad changed the name Pa La Raza 91.3 FM carries a Regional Mexican and Christian radio format.
