= XHTPG-TDT =

Television station in Tepic, Nayarit, Mexico

- Tepic, Nayarit; Mexico
- Channels: Digital: 24 (UHF); Virtual: 10
- Branding: Tele 10

Programming
- Affiliations: RTVE; DW; Canal 22; TV4 Guanajuato; TV UNAM; Canal Once

Ownership
- Owner: Gobierno del Estado de Nayarit
- Sister stations: XEGNAY-AM, XHTEN-FM

History
- Founded: August 18, 1993
- Call sign meaning: Tepic Gobierno

Technical information
- Licensing authority: CRT
- ERP: 20 kW
- HAAT: 518 m (1,699 ft)
- Transmitter coordinates: 21°31′58″N 104°54′47″W

Links
- Website: www.10tv.srtn.nayarit.gob.mx

XHTPG-TDT (virtual channel 10) is a state-owned television station in Tepic, Nayarit, forming part of the Sistema de Radio y Televisión de Nayarit state agency. Branded on air as 10 TV Nayarit, XHTPG carries a variety of local and national cultural programs and other shows relevant to the state and government of Nayarit. XHTPG signed on in 1993 and began broadcasting in 2015. It also airs programming from RTVE, DW, Canal 22, TV4 Guanajuato, TV UNAM and Canal Once.

The state network was known as "La Señal de la Gente" and later "Tele 10" during the government of Roberto Sandoval Castañeda. In 2017, XHTPG received a new logo in the style of other state agencies under Governor Antonio Echevarría García.

== Repeaters ==
XHTPG-TDT formerly had two dependent repeaters, at Ixtlán del Río and Tecuala.

From 2007 to 2017, the state government owned another repeater of XHTPG, XHNSJ-TDT 24 (formerly analog 6), in San Juan de Abajo, Bahía de Banderas Municipality. On October 16, 2017, the state government surrendered XHNSJ's concession, citing a budget insufficient to continue operations of the repeater.
