= XEGNAY-AM =

Public radio station in Tepic, Nayarit, Mexico

- Tepic, Nayarit; Mexico
- Frequency: 550 AM
- Branding: Radio Aztlán

Programming
- Format: Public radio

Ownership
- Owner: State government of Nayarit
- Sister stations: XHTNY-FM, XHTPG-TDT

History
- First air date: November 26, 1980
- Former call signs: XETNC-AM (1980–2015)
- Call sign meaning: Gobierno de Nayarit (AM)

Technical information
- Licensing authority: CRT
- Class: B
- Power: 2.5 kW daytime 150 watts nighttime
- Transmitter coordinates: 21°31′10″N 104°52′28″W

Links
- Website: aztlanradio.nayarit.gob.mx

XEGNAY-AM is a radio station in Tepic, Nayarit, Mexico, owned by the state government of Nayarit. It is branded as Radio Aztlán and broadcasts a public and cultural radio format on 550 AM.

== History ==
Logo used in the 2010s as Radio Aztlán

XETNC-AM came to air on November 26, 1980. It was the first noncommercial radio station in the state and was long known as Radio Aztlán.

A break in the station's permit history required the station to be reauthorized. As part of the authorization, for which a public use concession was awarded, XETNC became XEGNAY-AM.

In 2021, the state government received a concession for XHTNY-FM, an FM station on 100.3 MHz in Tepic.

Another radio station of the State government of Nayarit with the call letters XHTNY-FM, broadcasts on 100.3 FM.
