= XHEIM-FM =

Radio station in Saltillo, Coahuila, Mexico

- Saltillo, Coahuila; Mexico
- Frequency: 91.3 FM
- Branding: Región 91.3 FM

Programming
- Format: News/Talk and Regional Mexican

Ownership
- Owner: Capital Media; (Radiodifusoras Capital, S.A. de C.V.)
- Operator: Grupo Región

History
- First air date: October 1, 1986 (concession)

Technical information
- Licensing authority: CRT
- Class: B1
- ERP: 25 kW
- HAAT: −170.2 m (−558 ft)
- Transmitter coordinates: 25°25′21″N 101°00′04″W

Links
- Website: Capital Coahuila

XHEIM-FM is a radio station on 91.3 FM in Saltillo, Coahuila, Mexico. The station is owned by Capital Media and operated by Grupo Región as Región 91.3 FM with a News/Talk and Regional Mexican format.

== History ==
XEIM-AM received its concession on October 1, 1986. Owned by Emma Graciela Ibarra Calderón, it broadcast on 810 kHz with 1 kW day. Ownership continued to evolve, with a transfer to Grupo ACIR (XEIM, S.A. de C.V.), which had already been representing the station and supplying its programs, in 1996 and later to Radiorama. In 2011, operation was transferred to Voler, S.A. de C.V., which sold its stations to CapitalMedia in 2015 (though Capital had been operating them for some time).

It was authorized in 2011 for a migration to the FM band and in 2016 for a relocation of its transmitter.

In August 2019, the station changed names to La Loca, dropping the Capital Máxima brand but remaining under Capital operation. The grupera format was dropped altogether on January 27, 2020 as the station flipped to romantic.

On July 29, 2020, it was revealed that David Aguillón, a former PRI political figure, would lease Capital's four Coahuila radio stations; the formation of Grupo Región was formally announced on September 14.
