= XHEOB-FM =

Radio station in Pichucalco, Chiapas, Mexico

- Pichucalco, Chiapas, Mexico; Mexico
- Frequency: 91.3 MHz
- Branding: Ke Buena

Programming
- Format: Grupera
- Affiliations: Radiópolis

Ownership
- Owner: Radio Núcleo; (XEOB Promotora de Radio, S.A.)

History
- First air date: October 31, 1984 (concession)

Technical information
- ERP: 10 kW
- HAAT: 90.9 m
- Transmitter coordinates: 17°37′34.9″N 93°09′53.2″W

XHEOB-FM is a radio station on 91.3 FM in Pichucalco, Chiapas in Mexico. It carries the Ke Buena national grupera format from Radiópolis.

== History ==
XEOB-AM received its concession in 1942 and operated on 670 kHz. It was owned by Francisco Marmolejo Beltrán. It was approved for AM-FM migration in 2010.

Around 2014, XEOB began targeting the Villahermosa radio market with Grupo Siete's grupera format. That agreement ended in 2018 with the station returning to full Radio Núcleo operation.
