= KCON (AM) =

Radio station in Conway, Arkansas (1950–2007)

Conway, Arkansas; United States
- Frequency: 1230 kHz

Programming
- Format: Contemporary hit radio

Ownership
- Owner: University of Central Arkansas
- Sister stations: KUCA (FM)

History
- First air date: November 13, 1950
- Last air date: March 10, 2007
- Call sign meaning: "Conway"

Technical information
- Facility ID: 33739
- Class: C
- Power: 1,000 watts
- Transmitter coordinates: 35°4′23.11″N 92°27′36.57″W

KCON was a radio station broadcasting on 1230 kHz in Conway, Arkansas, United States. It operated from 1950 to 2007 and was last owned by the University of Central Arkansas (UCA). From 1950 to 1998, KCON was a private commercial radio broadcasting station owned by Conway Broadcasting Company and later by the KCON Broadcasting Company.

== History ==
=== Commercial years ===
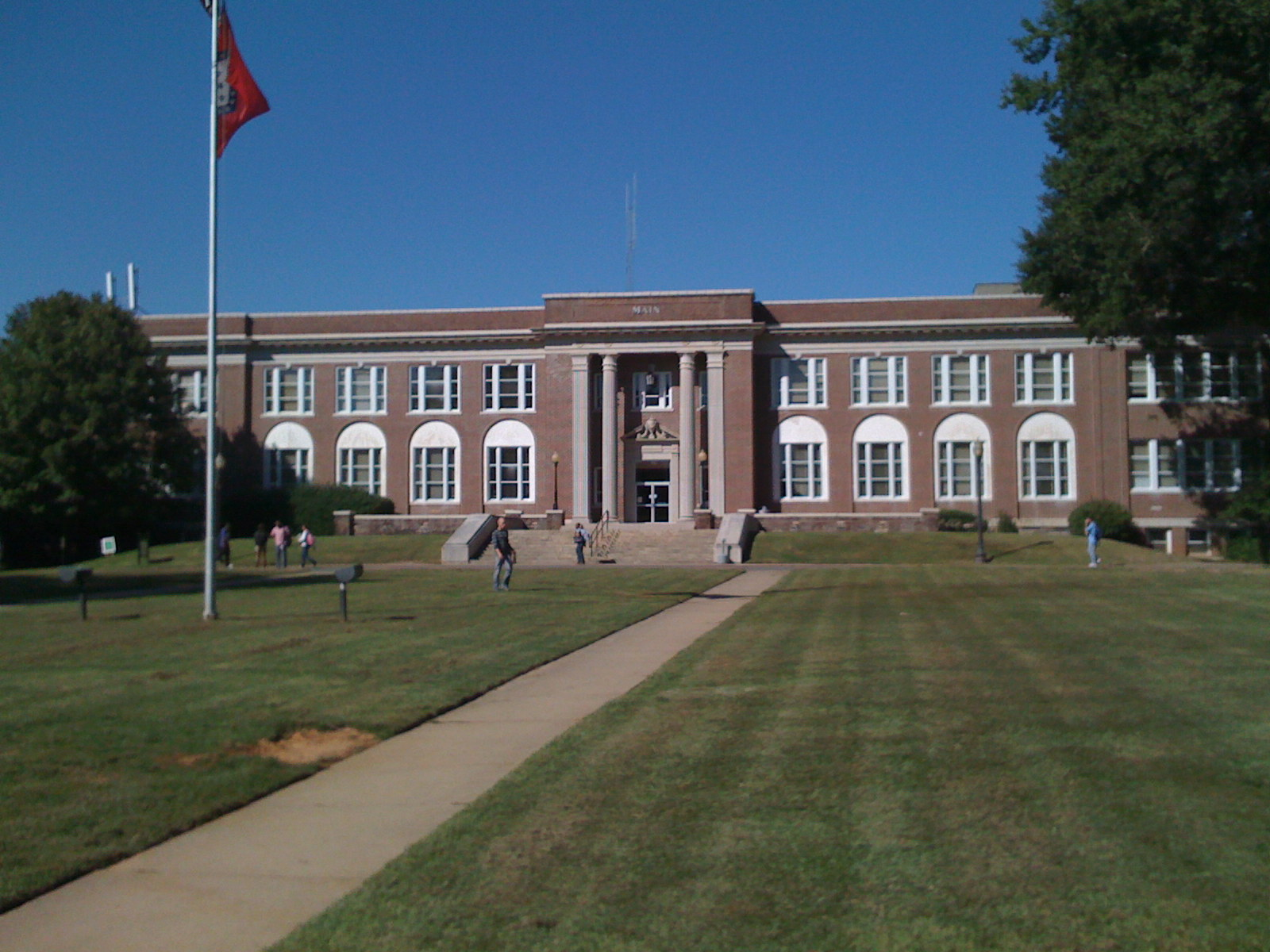
UCA's Main Hall was its administration building and the first home of KCON.

The Conway Broadcasting Company applied for a new 250-watt radio station on April 10, 1948, serving Conway. After a comparative hearing, the Federal Communications Commission granted the application on July 26, 1950. From the first day of KCON's operation on November 13, 1950, the station had strong ties to the local Arkansas State Teachers College, today's University of Central Arkansas (UCA); the studios and transmitter were at the school's administration building. The KCON facilities also supported the first FM outlet in central Arkansas, KOWN (97.7 FM), which Clayton had put on the air March 5, 1949, while waiting for the AM application to be adjudicated. This station was deleted shortly after the AM was approved to begin broadcasting.

The other original local stockholders in the Conway Broadcasting Company sold their stakes to previous part-owner James E. Clayton in 1957; Clayton, who had previously been an engineer at KARK radio in Little Rock, died in 1961.

At the end of 1964, the FCC approved the relocation of the KCON transmitter from the administration building to a separate site on campus along with a power increase to 1,000 watts, and two years later, the studios also moved to a site on Parkway Avenue. The relocation of KCON off campus opened up room for the school to start its own station, KASC (91.5 FM). Madge Clayton, James's widow, continued to own the station alongside Sam Clark and Bill Johnson until three men from Hope acquired the full-service, middle of the road outlet in late 1977. This arrangement lasted less than three years, with Clayton, Johnson and others repurchasing KCON in 1980. That same year, Monty Rowell, a UCA alumnus who had been working part-time at KCON since 1978, joined full-time; he would later be general manager and was involved with the station for the rest of its history.

Throughout its history, KCON had a focus on local news and sports. It was the primary radio home of UCA football, not missing a game since 1966. By the start of 1998, however, revenues had sagged as more businesses were owned by out-of-town interests and cable television offered cheaper advertising; the station would have needed major equipment replacements. As a result, management announced that KCON would close on March 10, 1998.

=== UCA ownership ===
Simultaneous with the closure of KCON as a commercial station KCON Broadcasting Company gifted the station's license, as well as assets including the transmitter site and land to the university, which opted to revive it as a second outlet for student-produced programming; this came after some agitation for increased student involvement at KUCA. Rowell also joined the UCA staff to lead KCON and later KUCA. A contemporary hit radio format was chosen for the outlet, which took up residence in the basement of the UCA student center.

Growth at the university, however, would ultimately claim KCON for good. The station shut down again on March 10, 2007, nine years to the day of its first closure; it had been deemed too cost-prohibitive to relocate and rebuild the transmitter site, where UCA was to build a new parking lot. Rowell continued to lead KUCA until 2014.
