= WSVA =

Radio station in Harrisonburg, Virginia

- Harrisonburg, Virginia; United States
- Broadcast area: Central Shenandoah Valley
- Frequency: 550 kHz
- Branding: 92.1 FM and 550 AM WSVA

Programming
- Format: News/talk
- Affiliations: ABC News Radio; CBS News Radio; NBC News Radio; Compass Media Networks; Salem Radio Network; Westwood One

Ownership
- Owner: Saga Communications; (Tidewater Communications, LLC)
- Sister stations: WHBG; WMQR; WQPO; WSIG; WWRE

History
- First air date: June 9, 1935
- Call sign meaning: We Serve Virginia Agriculture

Technical information
- Licensing authority: FCC
- Facility ID: 39493
- Class: B
- Power: 5,000 watts day; 1,000 watts night
- Transmitter coordinates: 38°27′4.4″N 78°54′28.1″W
- Translator: 92.1 W221CF (Harrisonburg)
- Repeater: (96.1-2) WMQR-HD2 (Broadway)

Links
- Public license information: Public file; LMS
- Webcast: Listen live
- Website: www.wsvaonline.com

WSVA (550 AM) is a commercial radio station licensed to Harrisonburg, Virginia, United States, and serving the Central Shenandoah Valley. It broadcasts a news/talk format and is owned by Saga Communications, through licensee Tidewater Communications, LLC. The studios and offices are on Heritage Center Way in Harrisonburg.

By day, WSVA transmits with 5,000 watts non-directional, but at night (to protect other stations on 550 AM from interference) it reduces power to 1,000 watts and uses a directional antenna with a three-tower array. The transmitter is on Garbers Church Road near West Market Street (U.S. Route 33) in Harrisonburg. Programming is also heard on 250-watt FM translator W221CF at 92.1 MHz.

== History ==
=== Early years ===
WSVA ("We Serve Virginia Agriculture") signed on the air on June 9, 1935. It was the first radio station to broadcast in Virginia's Shenandoah Valley. The station was owned by Frederick L. Allman and the original power was only 500 watts. The station was an affiliate of the NBC Red Network, carrying its dramas, comedies, news, sports, soap operas, game shows and big band broadcasts during the "Golden Age of Radio". Locally, it offered news, agricultural programs, music and talk.

In 1946, it added the Shenandoah Valley's first FM station, WSVA-FM (now WQPO). In 1953, it put Channel 3 on the air, WSVA-TV (now WHSV-TV). Because 550 AM was an NBC Radio affiliate, WSVA-TV mostly carried NBC television shows, but it also broadcast some programs from CBS, ABC and the Dumont Television Network. Allman sold his stations to a partnership of Transcontinent Television and former NBC executive Hamilton Shea in 1956, earning a significant return on his investment of 21 years earlier.

=== Washington Star ===
In the 1950s, as network programming moved from radio to television, WSVA switched to a full service radio format of middle of the road (MOR) music, news and sports. In 1959, the Washington Evening Star, owner of WMAL AM-FM-TV in Washington, D.C., bought Transcontinent's share of the stations, as well as 1% of Shea's stake.

Michigan businessman James Gilmore bought WSVA-AM-FM-TV in 1965. He sold off Channel 3 in 1976, but Gilmore held onto the radio stations until 1987, when he sold them to local businessman John David VerStandig. Over the years, VerStandig added WTGD-FM, WJDV-FM, and WHBG to his radio portfolio.

=== Expanded Band assignment ===
On March 17, 1997, the Federal Communications Commission (FCC) announced that 88 stations had been given permission to move to newly available "Expanded Band" transmitting frequencies, ranging from 1610 to 1700 kHz. WSVA was authorized to move from 550 to 1700 kHz. A construction permit for the expanded band station was assigned the call sign WEZI on November 17, 1997. However this station was never built, and its construction permit was cancelled on January 16, 2004.

=== New studios and FM translator ===
In 2009, WSVA moved into a new building with modern studios and offices. It is located on the same property as the old building, on Heritage Center Way.

Logo before prioritizing the FM over the AM

On January 1, 2015, the station began simulcasting its programming on FM translator W221CF, transmitting on 92.1 MHz. It makes WSVA programming available to listeners who prefer FM radio. It also exists to fill in the gaps in WSVA's nighttime coverage. The AM transmitter cuts its power to 1,000 watts at night to protect the nighttime signal of WGR in Buffalo, New York, and other stations on 550 AM in the Eastern United States.

The sale of VerStandig Broadcasting of Harrisonburg to Saga Communications was closed on July 31, 2015. It included WSVA and several other Shenandoah Valley radio stations. The purchase price was $9.64 million.

== Programming ==
The WSVA weekday schedule begins with Early Mornings with Frank Wilt and Jim Britt. Mario Retrosi, WSVA's News Director, hosts "Late Afternoons" drive time. At noon, an hour of news and agricultural reports airs. The rest of the weekday schedule is nationally syndicated talk programs: The Ramsey Show, The Mark Levin Show, Bill O'Reilly, America at Night with McGraw Milhaven, Red Eye Radio, America in the Morning and The Markley, Van Camp and Robbins Show.

Weekends feature shows on money, car repair, home repair, travel and gardening. Weekend syndicated programs include The Kim Komando Show, Around the House, Talkin Pets with Jon Patch, Jill on Money and Sterling on Sunday. Music and the Spoken Word and The Car Doctor with Ron Annanian. Most hours begin with an update from CBS News Radio.

WSVA broadcasts local sports including James Madison University football and basketball, along with high school football, basketball and baseball.

== Translator ==
In addition to the main station, WSVA is relayed by an FM translator to widen its broadcast area.

Broadcast translator for WSVA
Call sign	Frequency	City of license	FID	ERP (W)	HAAT	Class	FCC info
W221CF	92.1 FM	Harrisonburg, Virginia	151081	250	130 m (427 ft)	D	LMS
