= WQPO =

Radio station in Harrisonburg, Virginia

- Harrisonburg, Virginia; United States
- Broadcast area: Central Shenandoah Valley
- Frequency: 100.7 MHz (HD Radio)
- Branding: Q101

Programming
- Language: English
- Format: Contemporary hit radio
- Subchannels: HD2: Oldies "Pure Oldies 101.3"; HD3: Soft adult contemporary "EZ Favorites 100.1"
- Affiliations: United Stations Radio Networks; Westwood One

Ownership
- Owner: Saga Communications; (Tidewater Communications, LLC)
- Sister stations: WHBG; WMQR; WSIG; WSVA; WWRE

History
- First air date: November 24, 1946
- Former call signs: WSVA-FM (1946–1974)
- Former frequencies: 94.3 MHz (1946–1951)

Technical information
- Licensing authority: FCC
- Facility ID: 39492
- Class: B
- ERP: 50,000 watts
- HAAT: 150 meters (490 ft)
- Transmitter coordinates: 38°27′8.0″N 78°54′32.0″W
- Translator: See below

Links
- Public license information: Public file; LMS
- Webcast: Listen live; HD2: Listen live
- Website: q101online.com; HD2: pureoldies1013.com; HD3: myeasyfm.com

WQPO (100.7 FM) is a contemporary hit radio formatted broadcast radio station licensed to Harrisonburg, Virginia, United States, serving the Central Shenandoah Valley. WQPO is owned by Saga Communications.

== HD Radio ==
WQPO-HD3 was launched in early 2016, carrying a classic rock format branded as "V100.1; Iconic Rock". WQPO-HD3 is relayed by W261CV on 100.1 in Harrisonburg, from which it derived its branding. On the morning of May 9, 2018, WQPO-HD3 flipped from classic rock to soft adult contemporary, branded as "EZ Favorites 100.1".

WQPO-HD2 flipped from a simulcast of sports radio WHBG (1360 AM) to original programming as oldies-formatted "Pure Oldies 101.3" on May 25, 2018.

Call sign	Frequency	City of license	FID	ERP (W)	HAAT	Class	FCC info	Notes
W261CV	100.1 FM	Harrisonburg, Virginia	139550	250	553 m (1,814 ft)	D	LMS	Relays HD3
W267BA	101.3 FM	Harrisonburg, Virginia	141357	100	564 m (1,850 ft)	D	LMS	Relays HD2
