= XHACE-FM =

Radio station in Mazatlán, Sinaloa, Mexico

- Mazatlán, Sinaloa; Mexico
- Frequency: 91.3 FM
- Branding: Radio Fórmula

Programming
- Format: Talk radio

Ownership
- Owner: Grupo Fórmula; (Transmisora Regional Radio Fórmula, S.A. de C.V.)

History
- First air date: November 26, 1973 (AM) (concession); 1994 (FM)
- Former call signs: XEACE-AM
- Former frequencies: 1470 kHz

Technical information
- Licensing authority: CRT
- Class: B1
- ERP: 10 kW
- HAAT: 32.9 m (108 ft)

Links
- Webcast: Listen live
- Website: radioformula.com.mx

XHACE-FM is a radio station on 91.3 FM in Mazatlán, Sinaloa, Mexico. It is owned by Grupo Fórmula and carries its talk radio format.

== History ==
XEACE received its first concession in November 1973. It was owned by Pablo Xibillé Partida and maintained the name Radio Éxitos for many years.

XEACE became a combo in 1994. Xibillé died on August 12, 2003, three years after selling the station to Radio Fórmula.

In 2017, XHACE was one of the first stations to change to the new Trión rock format, with Radio Fórmula news programs remaining on the schedule. The station dropped Trión in April 2020.
