= Canal Once =

Mexican public TV network

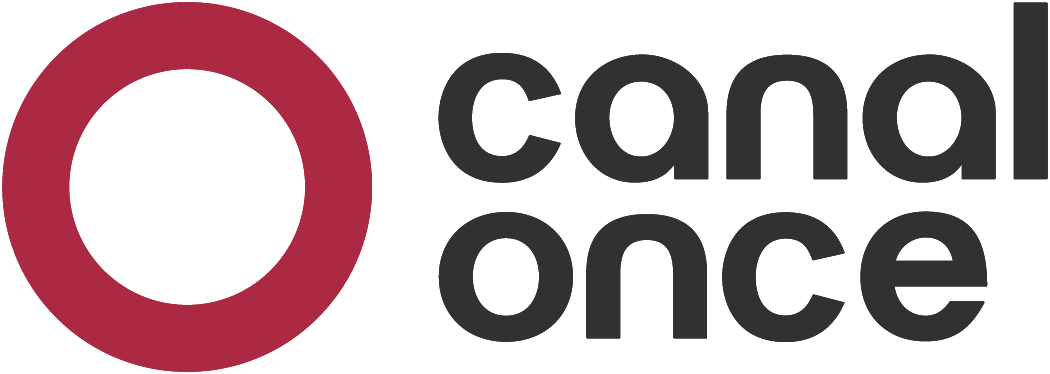
- Logo used since 2025
- Broadcast area: Mexico
- Transmitters: See below
- Headquarters: Mexico City

Programming
- Language: Spanish
- Picture format: HDTV 1080i (downscaled to 480i for the SD feed)

Ownership
- Owner: National Polytechnic Institute
- Sister channels: Once Niñas y Niños; Canal Once Internacional

History
- Launched: March 2, 1959; 67 years ago
- Former names: Canal 11 XEIPN-TV (1959-1969); TVONCE (1978-1986); Canal Once (1991-1996); Once TV (1996-2008); Once TV México (2008-2013)

Links
- Website: canalonce.mx

Availability

Terrestrial
- Digital terrestrial television (Mexico): Channel 11.1

Streaming media
- Sling TV: Internet Protocol television

Canal Once (channel 11) (stylised as canal once, formerly once and once tv) is a Mexican educational broadcast television network owned by National Polytechnic Institute. The network's flagship station is XEIPN-TDT channel 11 in Mexico City. It broadcasts across Mexico through nearly 40 TV transmitters and is required carriage on all Mexican cable and satellite providers. The network also operates an international feed which is available in the United States, Spain and the rest of countries of Latin America and the Caribbean via satellite from DirecTV and CANTV, via online from VEMOX, VIVOplay and also on various cable outlets, on "Latino" or "Spanish" tiers. Most of its programs are also webcast through the Internet, though its programming is not the same as the actual broadcasters or satellite signal.

== History ==
The network began broadcasting on March 2, 1959, when its flagship station became the first non-profit educational and cultural television station in Mexico, owned and operated by a Mexican institution of higher education. The television channel was conceived by Alejo Peralta y Díaz, the director of the Instituto Politécnico Nacional between 1956 and 1959, and supported by his successor Eugenio Méndez Docurro, as well as Secretary of Communications and Transportation Walter Cross Buchanan and Jaime Torres Bodet, Secretary of Public Education. Its first broadcast was a mathematics class transmitted from a small television studio located at the Casco de Santo Tomás, in the northern part of Mexico City.

In 1969, Canal Once was the first Mexico City TV station to relocate its transmitter to Cerro del Chiquihuite, in order to improve its signal. It would later be joined on the mountain by most of Mexico City's other television stations as well as several radio broadcasters. Around this time, Canal Once converted to color. By the 1980s, it already had four of its own studios.

In the 1990s and 2000s, Once TV (as the network had been renamed in 1997) embarked on a two-pronged expansion strategy. The IPN built transmitters in cities such as Cuernavaca and Tijuana in the late 1990s, and in the 2000s and early 2010s, it expanded to build in the states of Sinaloa, Durango and Chihuahua. It also allied with state networks, such as those of Guerrero, Nayarit and Quintana Roo, providing them with Once TV programs. The launch of the Organismo Promotor de Medios Audiovisuales, now the Sistema Público de Radiodifusión del Estado Mexicano (SPR), in 2010 marked the beginning of a second expansion, which finally brought Once TV to such large cities as Guadalajara, Monterrey and Puebla.

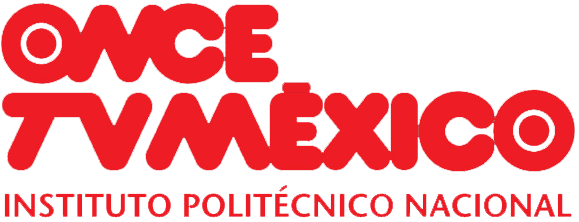
Logo used from 2011 to 2013.

The SPR operates 26 transmitters to the IPN's 13, and all of them (with the exception of Mexico City) carry Canal Once as one of their subchannels.

In 2013, Once TV México returned to its original name of Canal Once as part of a branding refresh.

In 2015, the IPN launched Once Niños, a subchannel of Canal Once featuring children's programming, which is available on all Canal Once transmitters operated by the IPN as well as on all Mexican cable systems. On December 31, 2015, Canal Once completed its digital television transition.

In July 2016, Olympusat added the channel to its OTT platform, VEMOX.

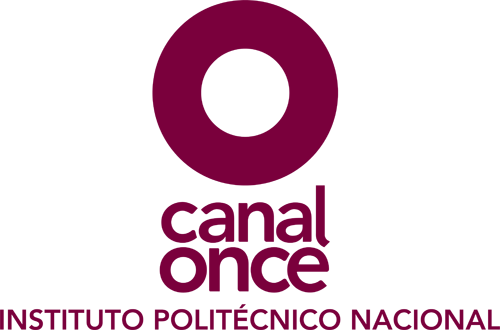
Logo used from 2013 to 2019.

On January 23, 2019, President Andrés Manuel López Obrador nominated senator José Antonio Álvarez Lima to serve as the new director of Canal Once. marking his return to public media after 28 years away. Álvarez was installed in that position in March. He announced his resignation in late October 2020, in order to fill the Senate vacancy in his seat that resulted from the death of alternate senator Joel Molina Ramírez. If Álvarez Lima had opted to remain at Canal Once, the vacancy would have triggered a special election for the seat. He was replaced by 25-year-old Carlos Brito Lavalle, the youngest director in the station's history, who had previously helped coordinate the Aprende en Casa program and held other posts.

In 2021, Canal Once was authorized a further 24 new transmitters, many to be co-sited with existing or new SPR installations.

From May 23 to August 2, 2026, IPN students occupied the Canal Once facilities in protest to demand a budget increase, the director's resignation, and greater attention to the deterioration of school facilities.

== Logos ==
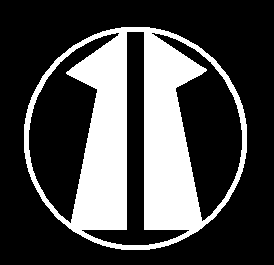
1959-1986

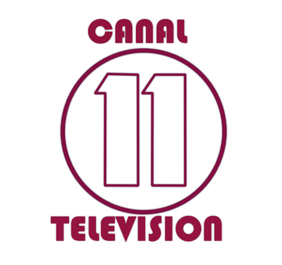
1986-1990

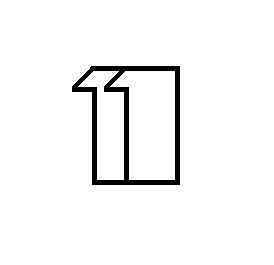
1991-1996

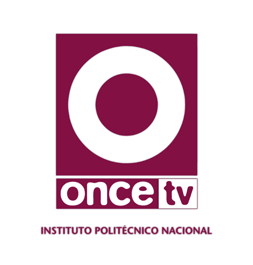
1996-2007

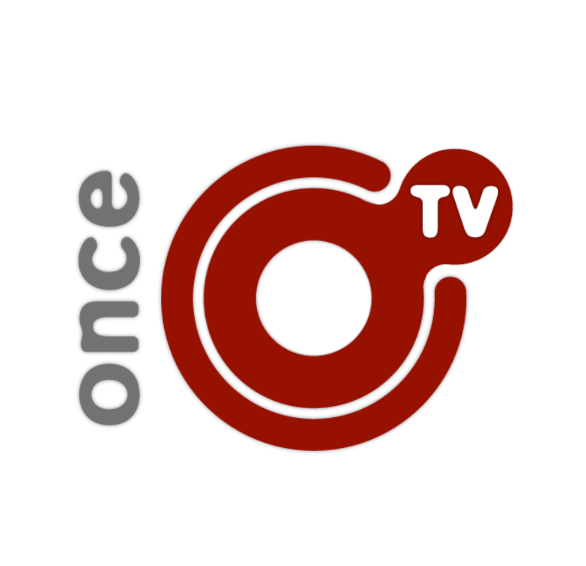
2007-2011

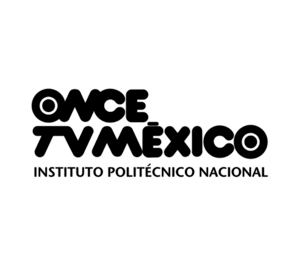
2011-2013

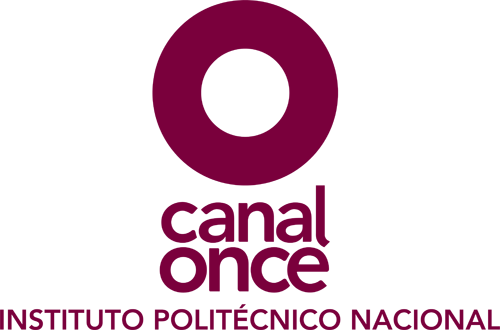
2013-2019

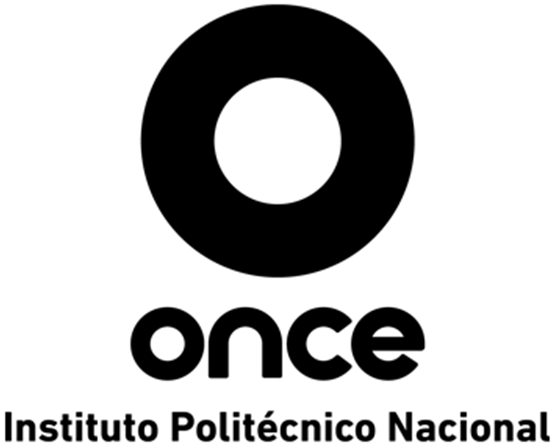
2019–2025

=== Once Niños Logos ===
2014-2016

2016-2020

2020–2025

== Programs ==
Canal Once produces a wide variety of cultural and educational programming. It also produces and airs Once Noticias national newscasts.

Canal Once has also been one of the national broadcasters that has carried the Olympic Games under contract from América Móvil, including the 2014 Summer Youth Olympics and 2016 Summer Olympics.

During Holy Week, as a result of the coronavirus pandemic, Canal Once, Canal Catorce, and Capital 21 co-produced for the first time television coverage of the Passion Play of Iztapalapa.

== Awards ==
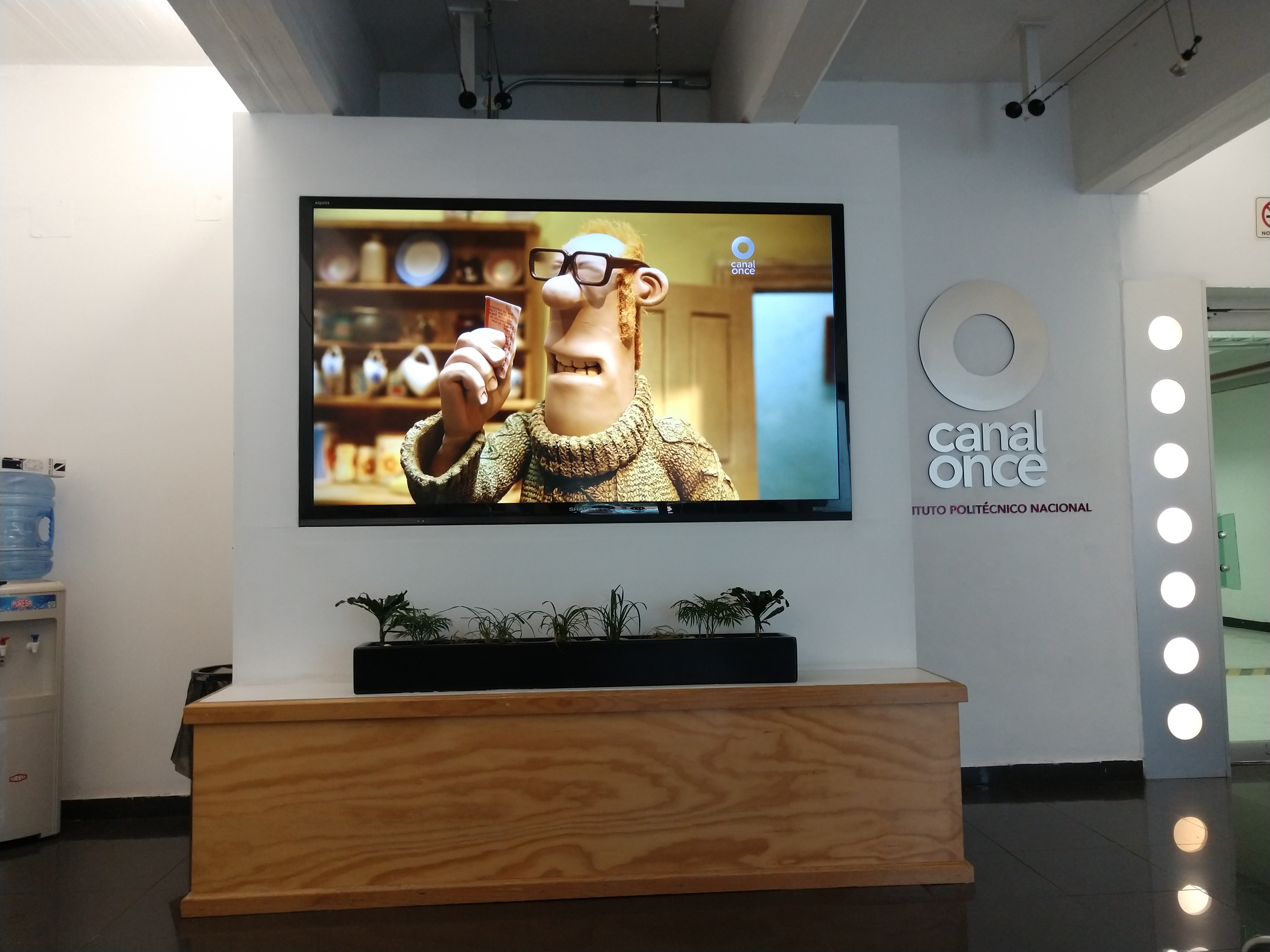
Canal Once studios in Mexico City, containing a broadcast of Shaun the Sheep.

Canal Once has won many national and international prizes, including the following:

- Promax World Gold Awards 2004 New York, U.S.:

Golden Prize T 08 for Program Promotion: "Violencia Doméstica"
Golden Prize T 10 for Special Event Program Promotion: "Violencia Doméstica"
Silver Prize T 08 for Program Promotion: "Diálogos en confianza" (Talk show)
Silver Prize T 27 for Non-Promotional Animation: "Master of lounge music"

- Promax BDA World Gold Awards 2004, New York, U.S.:

Gold 56 for Consumer Topical Advertising: "Pasión por la Naturaleza"
Silver 4 for Topical Print: "Tour de cine francés"
Silver 65 for Poster: "Tour de cine francés"
Silver 69 for Illustration for Print: "Pasión por la Naturaleza"
Bronze 13 for Open: "Violencia Familiar"
Bronze 16 for Art Direction & Design, Topical Promo: "Diálogos en Confianza"

- I Festival Internacional de Documentales de Madrid 2004, Madrid, Spain:

Jury's Special Mention for "Series del Once"

== IPN-owned transmitters ==
Canal Once has an extensive transmitter network owned by the IPN that is supplemented by the SPR transmitter network. All Canal Once transmitters, whether owned by the IPN or the SPR, use virtual channel 11.

Once Niñas y Niños is only available on Canal Once transmitters owned by the IPN and as the subchannel of one separately owned station, XHZHZ-TDT in Zacatecas, Zacatecas. A third subchannel, known as Mente Abierta, was authorized for the IPN transmitter network in August 2020 but never launched.

One transmitter, in Cuernavaca, carries Canal Catorce as a subchannel under agreement with the SPR.

RF	VC	Call sign	Location	ERP
7	11	XHCPAE-TDT	Aguascalientes, Ags.	12.654 kW
15	11	XHCPDE-TDT	Tijuana, BC	79.011 kW
14	11	XHCPCK-TDT	La Paz, BCS	59.86 kW
21	11	XHCPCM-TDT	Tapachula, Chis.	11.853 kW
21	11	XHCPAX-TDT	Tuxtla Gutiérrez, Chis.	99.334 kW
20	11	XHCHU-TDT	Cd. Cuauhtémoc, Chih.	22.09 kW
20	11	XHCHD-TDT	Cd. Delicias, Chih.	146.17 kW
25	11	XHCHI-TDT	Chihuahua, Chih.	129.734 kW
9	11	XHCPCO-TDT	Ciudad Juárez, Chih.	63.488 kW
31	11	XHCPDF-TDT	Saltillo, Coah.	9.08 kW
7	11	XHCPBI-TDT	Colima, Col.	12.776 kW
33	11	XEIPN-TDT	Mexico City; Coacalco; Chalco–Ixtapaluca	103.929 kW; 0.419 kW; 0.2319 kW
33	11	XHDGO-TDT	Durango, Dgo.	10.04 kW
34	11	XHGPD-TDT	Gómez Palacio, Dgo.	14.23 kW
7	11	XHCPBN-TDT	Celaya, Gto.	4.27 kW
18	11	XHCPAB-TDT	Acapulco, Gro.	
23	11	XHPBGD-TDT	Guadalajara, Jal.	34.998 kW
21	11	XHCPDG-TDT	Valle de Bravo, Mex.	2.82 kW
20	11	XHCPDH-TDT	Cuernavaca, Mor.	22.92 kW
14	11	XHCPEZ-TDT	Nuevo Vallarta, Nay.	
36	11	XHPBMY-TDT	Monterrey, NL	45 kW
14	11	XHCPBS-TDT	Oaxaca, Oax.	42.818 kW
12	11	XHCPAN-TDT	Puebla, Pue.	83.231 kW
17	11	XHPBCN-TDT	Cancún, Q. Roo	111.658 kW
31	11	XHCPFC-TDT	Chetumal, Q. Roo	
24	11	XHCPDJ-TDT	San Luis Potosí, SLP	22.52 kW
13	11	XHCPFD-TDT	Ciudad Valles, SLP	
21	11	XHCPDI-TDT	Culiacán, Sin.	44.45 kW
21	11	XHCPAP-TDT	Los Mochis, Sin.	218.51 kW
19	11	XHCPBW-TDT	Mazatlán, Sin.	173.649 kW
19	11	XHCPBX-TDT	Ciudad Obregón, Son.	10.588 kW
9	11	XHCPFF-TDT	Guaymas, Son.	
10	11	XHCPFG-TDT	Huimanguillo–Cárdenas, Tab.	
31	11	XHCPEK-TDT	Villahermosa, Tab.	
15	11	XHCPFI-TDT	Ciudad Victoria, Tamps.	
9	11	XHCPCF-TDT	Reynosa, Tamps.	1.244 kW
10	11	XHCPCG-TDT	Tampico, Tamps.	
12	11	XHCPCH-TDT	Coatzacoalcos, Ver.	0.569 kW
12	11	XHCPAQ-TDT	Córdoba–Orizaba, Ver.	
4	11	XHCPFN-TDT	Poza Rica, Ver.	
31	11	XHCPFP-TDT	San Andrés Tuxtla, Ver.	
7	11	XHCPCI-TDT	Xalapa, Ver.	8.732 kW
19	11	XHCPFQ-TDT	Mérida, Yuc.	
28	11	XHCPCJ-TDT	Zacatecas, Zacs.	10.758 kW

In 2017, the IPN was authorized for four additional transmitters; it surrendered the concession for one of the four, at Tepic, Nayarit, to the IFT in 2019.

Canal Once was formerly relayed by the state networks of Guerrero (Radio y Televisión de Guerrero), Nayarit (Tele 10) and Quintana Roo (Sistema Quintanarroense de Comunicación Social), and also by XHCOZ-TDT, an independent local station in Cozumel, Quintana Roo. XHCOZ holds virtual channel 11 as an artifact of its former carriage of Canal Once's programming.

Canal Once continues to supply programming to state networks, such as XHBZC-TDT in Baja California Sur. Some commercial stations in markets without public television air some Canal Once programming, notably XEJ-TDT in Ciudad Juárez and XEFE-TDT in Nuevo Laredo.
