= WZMB =

- Greenville, North Carolina; United States
- Frequency: 91.3 MHz
- Branding: WZMB 91.3 FM

Programming
- Format: Alternative rock

Ownership
- Owner: East Carolina University Student Media Board

Technical information
- Licensing authority: FCC
- Facility ID: 65601
- Class: A
- ERP: 280 watts
- HAAT: 41.0 meters
- Transmitter coordinates: 35°36′1.00″N 77°21′53.00″W

Links
- Public license information: Public file; LMS
- Website: www.piratemedia1.com/wzmb913fm/

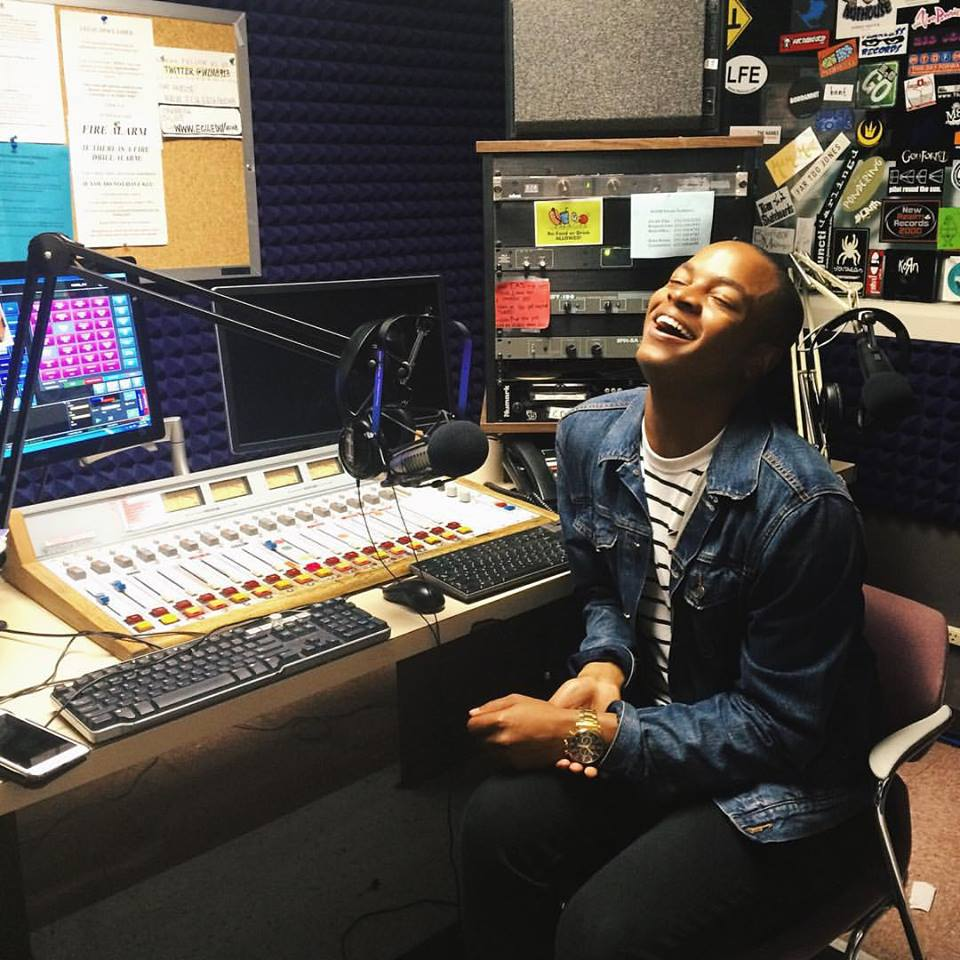
Jonathan McDougle in an interview with WZMB Radio, 2015

WZMB (91.3 FM) is a radio station broadcasting an Alternative rock format. Licensed to East Carolina University the station serves the Greenville, North Carolina area. The station is owned by East Carolina University Student Media Board.

== Studios ==
The WZMB studio facilities are located on the main campus of East Carolina University, in the Mendenhall Student Center Basement. The current studio has been occupied since 1991. The previous studio was located in the Old Joyner Library. WZMB has been on the air since 1982, where it replaced WWWS as the student-run radio station. In 1957 WWWS became a member of the International Goodwill network.
