= KBFR (pirate radio) =

Pirate radio station in Boulder, Colorado (2000–2005)

United States
- Broadcast area: Boulder, Colorado
- Frequencies: 95.3 MHz originally; now variable
- Branding: Boulder Free Radio

Programming
- Format: Freeform

History
- Call sign meaning: "Boulder Free Radio"

Technical information
- Class: Pirate
- ERP: approx. 150 watts originally; now variable
- Transmitter coordinates: 40.0°N 105.266667°W

KBFR (95.3 FM), also known as Boulder Free Radio, was a pirate radio (unlicensed, underground) station broadcasting from Boulder, Colorado, United States.

== History ==
Boulder Free Radio operated from March 2000 to January 2005 at 95.3 FM. Its power is similar to an LPFM station, approx 150 watts.

KBFR was founded by a pirate radio operator calling himself Monk. Monk still maintains an occasionally updated blog about KBFR and pirate radio called Courage, Truth & Booty.
