= KYJC =

Coordinates: 33°15′37″N 95°52′59″W

- Commerce, Texas; United States
- Frequency: 91.3 MHz

Programming
- Format: Christian radio

Ownership
- Owner: Penfold Communications, Inc.
- Sister stations: KDKR

Technical information
- Licensing authority: FCC
- Facility ID: 121869
- Class: A
- ERP: 350 watts
- HAAT: 53.2 meters (175 ft)

Links
- Public license information: Public file; LMS
- Website: kdkr.org

KYJC (91.3 FM) is a radio station licensed to Commerce, Texas. The station broadcasts a Christian talk and teaching format and is owned by Penfold Communications, Inc.
