= DWKN =

Philippine radio station

One Radio (DWKN)
Tabaco; Philippines
- Broadcast area: Northeastern Albay
- Frequency: 91.3 MHz
- Branding: One Radio 91.3 News FM

Programming
- Languages: Albayanon, Filipino
- Format: Contemporary MOR, News, Talk

Ownership
- Owner: Capricom Production & Management

History
- First air date: March 2005

Technical information
- Licensing authority: NTC
- Power: 5,000 watts

Links
- Website: http://www.oneradiotabaco.com/

DWKN (91.3 FM), broadcasting as One Radio 91.3 News FM, is a radio station owned and operated by Capricom Production & Management. Its studio is located at WCC Bldg., A. A. Berces St. cor. Sta. Cruz St., Brgy. Basud, Tabaco.
