= WXAC =

- Reading, Pennsylvania; United States
- Broadcast area: Berks County, Pennsylvania
- Frequency: 91.3 MHz

Programming
- Languages: English, Spanish
- Format: College radio

Ownership
- Owner: Albright College

History
- First air date: September 8, 1965; 61 years ago
- Former call signs: WALC
- Call sign meaning: W X Albright College

Technical information
- Licensing authority: FCC
- Facility ID: 880
- Class: A
- ERP: 210 watts
- HAAT: 12 meters (39 ft)
- Transmitter coordinates: 40°22′9.00″N 75°54′26.00″W

Links
- Public license information: Public file; LMS
- Webcast: Listen live
- Website: www.wxac.net

WXAC (91.3 FM) is a college radio station licensed to Reading, Pennsylvania, and serves the Reading area. It is owned and operated by Albright College. WXAC is the only local station that provides Spanish-language programming to Berks County, with about 50 hours per week hosted by volunteer DJs from the local community. The station broadcasts from the Berks Community Media Center.

== See also ==
- Albright College
- Campus radio
