= KSVY =

Community radio station in Sonoma, California

Sonoma, California; United States
- Broadcast area: Sonoma, California
- Frequency: 91.3 MHz
- Branding: Voice of the Valley

Programming
- Format: Community radio

Ownership
- Owner: Sonoma Valley Community Communications, Inc.

History
- First air date: February 9, 2004; 22 years ago

Technical information
- Licensing authority: FCC
- Facility ID: 78100
- Class: A
- ERP: 790 watts
- HAAT: 189 meters (620 feet)
- Transmitter coordinates: 38°13′54.6″N 122°29′50.9″W

Links
- Public license information: Public file; LMS
- Webcast: Listen Live
- Website: ksvy.org

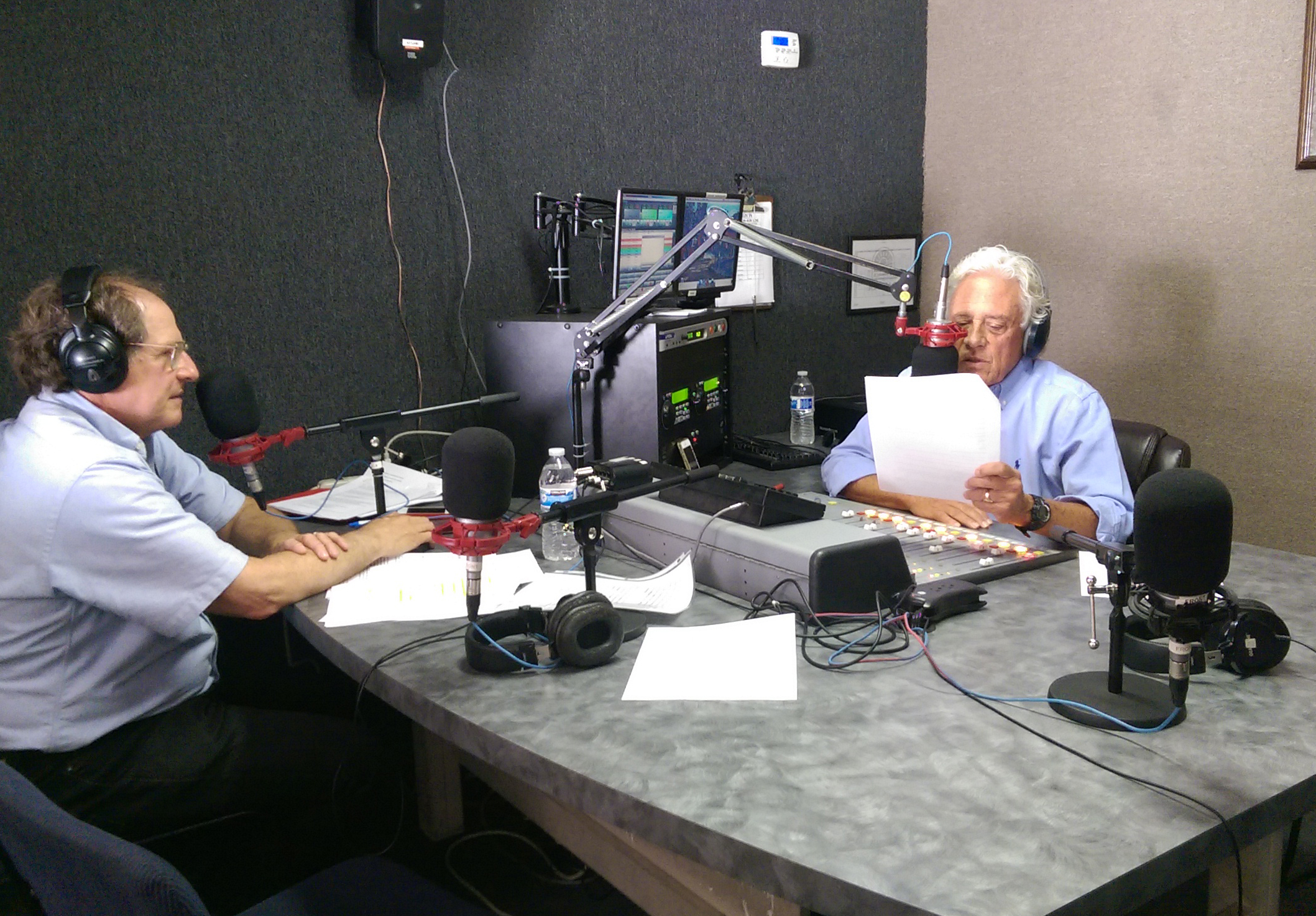
Inside the KSVY studio

KSVY (91.3 FM) is a radio station based in Sonoma, California. The station is owned by Sonoma Valley Community Communications, Inc.
