= DXOB =

Radio station in Misamis Occidental, Philippines

Radyo Positibo (DXOB)
Oroquieta; Philippines
- Broadcast area: Misamis Occidental
- Frequency: 91.3 MHz
- Branding: 91.3 Radyo Positibo

Programming
- Languages: Cebuano, Filipino
- Format: Religious Radio

Ownership
- Owner: Malindang Broadcasting Network Corporation

History
- Former call signs: DXNA (until 2023)
- Former names: Radio One (until 2020)

Technical information
- Licensing authority: NTC
- Power: 5 Kw

91.3 Radyo Positibo (DXOB 91.3 MHz) is an FM station owned and operated by Malindang Broadcasting Network Corporation. Its studios and transmitter are located along Magsaysay Ave., Brgy. Lower Loboc, Oroquieta.

The station was formerly known as Radio One until 2020, when it was rebranded as Radyo Positibo. In 2023, Malindang Broadcasting Network Corporation acquired the station from the M.I.T. Radio Television Network and changed its call letters to DXOB.
