= KRSC-FM =

Radio station in Claremore, Oklahoma

- Claremore, Oklahoma; United States
- Broadcast area: Tulsa, Oklahoma
- Frequency: 91.3 MHz

Programming
- Format: Variety

Ownership
- Owner: Rogers State University; (Board of Regents of The University of Oklahoma/Rogers State)

History
- First air date: 1980
- Former call signs: KNGX, KRSC
- Call sign meaning: Rogers State College

Technical information
- Licensing authority: FCC
- Facility ID: 57430
- Class: A
- ERP: 2,200 watts
- HAAT: 111 meters (364 ft)
- Transmitter coordinates: 36°19′6.00″N 95°38′18.00″W

Links
- Public license information: Public file; LMS
- Webcast: Listen live
- Website: www.rsuradio.com

KRSC-FM (91.3 FM) is a student-run college radio station at Rogers State University licensed to Claremore, Oklahoma, United States serving the Tulsa area. It broadcasts 24 hours a day at 2200 watts.

== Music ==
The station plays a mix of all styles and is classified as "college alternative." It also hosts a number of specialty shows including punk rock, bluegrass, classic country, reggae, world, Latin, hip hop, ska, electronica, garage and others.

== Student Staff ==
Music Director - Bobby Ruth
Traffic Director - Luke Smith
Production/Programming - Jaden Tibbles
Promotions - Aubrey Haught
Production/Programming - Elyssa Branham

== Full Time Staff ==
General Manager - Tip Crowley

== Signal ==
It is possible to hear KRSC in the Tulsa metro area and in some surrounding counties. The Signal is faint in West and South Tulsa, due to being in a fringe area.

== Online Streaming ==
The station can be heard live worldwide on its online web stream.
