= WAKJ =

Coordinates: 30°41′05″N 86°08′28″W

- DeFuniak Springs, Florida; United States
- Frequency: 91.3 MHz

Programming
- Format: Christian radio

Ownership
- Owner: First Baptist Church DeFuniak Springs; (First Baptist Church, Inc.)

History
- First air date: January 1997

Technical information
- Licensing authority: FCC
- Facility ID: 68290
- Class: A
- ERP: 1,200 watts
- HAAT: 69 meters (226 ft)

Links
- Public license information: Public file; LMS
- Webcast: Listen live
- Website: wakjradio.com

WAKJ is a Christian radio station licensed to DeFuniak Springs, Florida, broadcasting on 91.3 FM and is owned by First Baptist Church, Inc.
