= WHIF =

- Palatka, Florida; United States
- Frequency: 91.3 MHz
- Branding: 91.3 Hope FM

Programming
- Format: Christian Contemporary

Ownership
- Owner: Putnam Radio Ministries

History
- First air date: 1996
- Former call signs: WAEQ (1993-1994)
- Call sign meaning: Where Hope Is Found

Technical information
- Licensing authority: FCC
- Facility ID: 53953
- Class: A
- ERP: 1,700 watts
- HAAT: 97 meters (320 ft)
- Transmitter coordinates: 29°39′08″N 81°35′31″W

Links
- Public license information: Public file; LMS
- Webcast: Listen Live
- Website: whif.org

WHIF (91.3 FM) is a non-commercial radio station licensed to Palatka, Florida. The station is currently owned by Putnam Radio Ministries and airs a Christian contemporary format.
