= WVST-FM =

- Petersburg, Virginia; United States
- Broadcast area: Metro Petersburg
- Frequency: 91.3 MHz
- Branding: The Source 91.3 WVST

Programming
- Format: Variety

Ownership
- Owner: Virginia State University

History
- First air date: 1987
- Call sign meaning: Virginia State

Technical information
- Licensing authority: FCC
- Facility ID: 70337
- Class: A
- ERP: 2,200 Watts
- HAAT: 51 meters
- Transmitter coordinates: 37°14′15.0″N 77°24′55.0″W

Links
- Public license information: Public file; LMS
- Webcast: WVST-FM Webstream
- Website: WVST-FM Online

WVST-FM is a Variety formatted broadcast radio station licensed to Petersburg, Virginia, serving Metro Petersburg. WVST-FM is owned and operated by Virginia State University.
