= KZBV =

- Carmel Valley, California; United States
- Frequency: 91.3 MHz
- Branding: Aware FM

Programming
- Format: Christian contemporary

Ownership
- Owner: Aware FM, Inc.

Technical information
- Licensing authority: FCC
- Facility ID: 176698
- Class: A
- ERP: 100 watts
- HAAT: 14 meters (46 ft)
- Transmitter coordinates: 36°25′52″N 121°40′32″W
- Translator: 91.7 K219LL (Chualar)

Links
- Public license information: Public file; LMS

KZBV (91.3 FM) is a radio station licensed to Carmel Valley, California. The station broadcasts a Christian AC format branded "Aware FM" and is owned by Aware FM, Inc.

== Translator ==
KZBV's programming is rebroadcast on translator 91.7 K219LL, licensed to Chualar, California and serving Salinas, California.

Broadcast translator for KZBV
Call sign	Frequency	City of license	FID	ERP (W)	HAAT	Class	FCC info
K219LL	91.7 FM	Chualar, California	152139	8	656 m (2,152 ft)	D	LMS

== History ==
The station was first licensed in 2013. Its construction permit was originally held by Colina Alta Ministries and was donated to One Ministries, Inc. in 2010. In 2013, KZBV was sold to Aware FM, Inc., along with its translator K219LL, for $90,000. On August 25, 2020, the station and its translator were taken off the air due to damage caused by a wildfire. It resumed operations on August 20, 2021.
