= KWWM =

- Rock Springs, Wyoming; United States
- Broadcast area: Rock Springs
- Frequency: 91.3 MHz
- Branding: KWWM 91.3

Programming
- Format: College radio

Ownership
- Owner: Western Wyoming Community College

History
- First air date: March 28, 2012
- Call sign meaning: Western Wyoming Mustangs

Technical information
- Licensing authority: FCC
- Facility ID: 176944
- Class: A
- ERP: 280 watts
- HAAT: −54 meters (−177 ft)
- Transmitter coordinates: 41°35′31″N 109°14′13″W

Links
- Public license information: Public file; LMS
- Website: westernwyoming.edu/student-life/campus-amenities/mustang-radio.php

KWWM (91.3 FM) is a college radio station licensed to Rock Springs, Wyoming, United States. The station is owned and operated by Western Wyoming Community College. Like most college radio stations, it is operated by and contains programming created by students attending the college.

The station has also carried sports programming hosted by local students, as well as graduation ceremonies. Some of the students who have had shows on KWWM have gone on to work in larger broadcasting careers.

The station received a license on March 28, 2012, and primarily covers Rock Springs with its 218 watt signal. The transmitter is located on campus. It can also be heard in nearby Green River.
