= Breen, Colorado =

Unincorporated community in La Plata County, Colorado, United States

- Unincorporated community
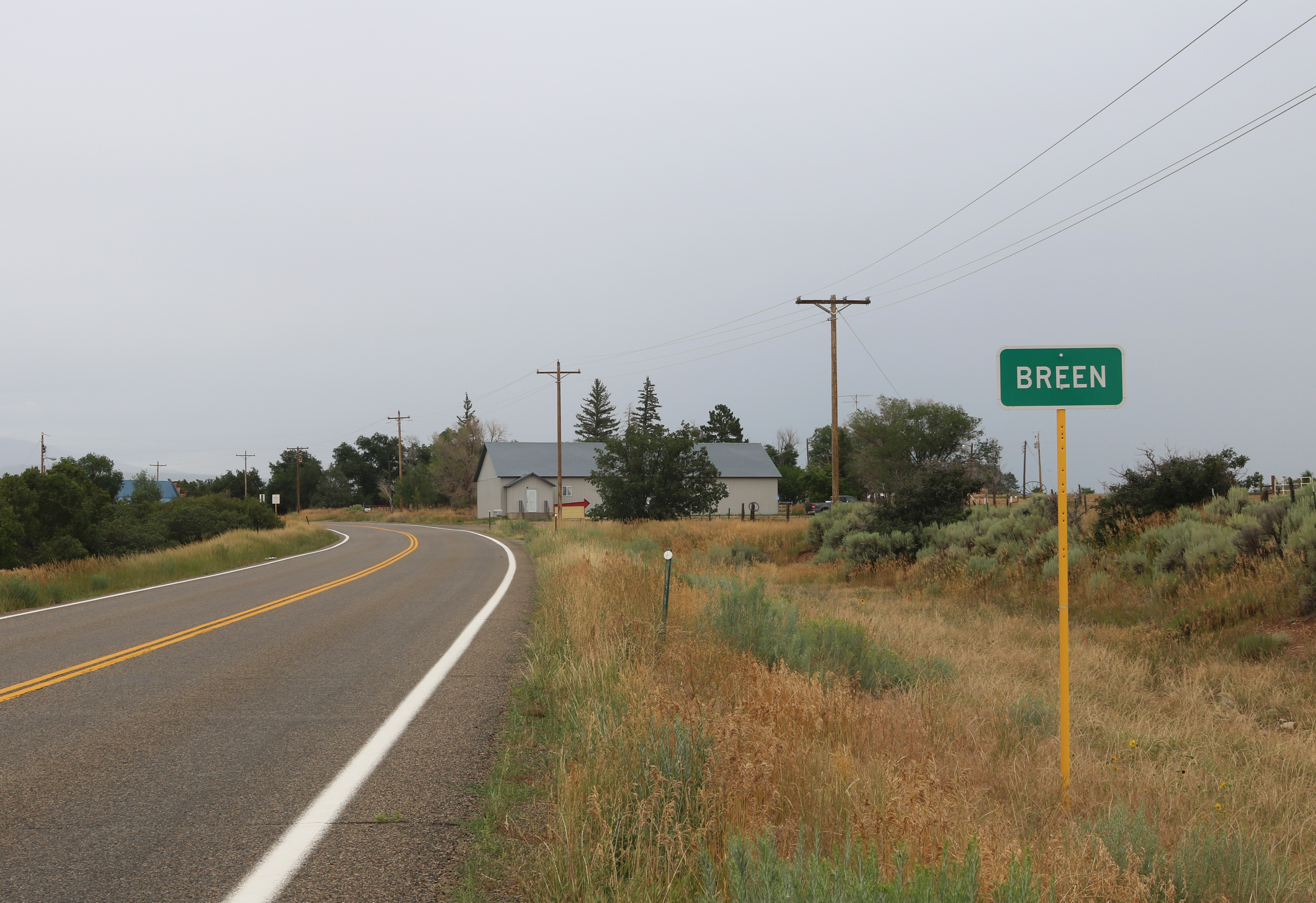
- Breen and the Breen Community Building in August 2019 along Colorado State Highway 140

- Location of Breen, Colorado. Breen (Colorado)
- Coordinates: 37°11′33″N 108°04′40″W
- Country: United States
- State: Colorado
- County: La Plata
- Tribe: Southern Ute Indian Tribe

Government
  - Type: Unincorporated community
  - Body: La Plata County
- Elevation: 7,346 ft (2,239 m)
- Time zone: UTC−07:00 (MST)
  - Summer (DST): UTC−06:00 (MDT)
- ZIP code: 81326
- Area code: 970
- GNIS pop ID: 179274

Breen is an unincorporated community on the Southern Ute Indian Reservation in La Plata County, Colorado, United States.

== History ==
The Southern Ute Indian Reservation was created on November 9, 1878. The Breen, Colorado, post office operated from July 19, 1901, until November 30, 1954. The community was named after Dr. Thomas Breen, a local educator.

== See also ==
- Southern Ute Indian Reservation
