= WHFG =

- Broussard, Louisiana; United States
- Broadcast area: Lafayette, Louisiana
- Frequency: 91.3 MHz

Programming
- Format: Religious

Ownership
- Owner: Family First

History
- Call sign meaning: We Have Faith in God

Technical information
- Licensing authority: FCC
- Facility ID: 83878
- Class: C3
- ERP: 6,000 watts
- HAAT: 112 meters (367 ft)
- Transmitter coordinates: 29°58′04″N 91°55′31″W

Links
- Public license information: Public file; LMS
- Website: WHFG website

WHFG (91.3 FM) is an American radio station licensed to serve the community of Lafayette, Louisiana, United States.

== Programming ==
The station's weekday lineup includes Bible Answers Live, Pioneer Memorial Church, and C.D. Brooks.
