= WSJE =

- Summersville, West Virginia; United States
- Broadcast area: Nicholas County, West Virginia
- Frequency: 91.3 MHz
- Branding: Evangelist Radio

Programming
- Format: Catholic Religious
- Affiliations: EWTN Radio

Ownership
- Owner: Evangelist Communications, Inc.

History
- First air date: October 31, 2010
- Call sign meaning: W St. John the Evangelist

Technical information
- Licensing authority: FCC
- Facility ID: 170876
- Class: A
- ERP: 240 Watts
- HAAT: 249.5 meters (819 ft)
- Transmitter coordinates: 38°21′38.50″N 80°38′50.40″W

Links
- Public license information: Public file; LMS

WSJE is a Catholic Religious formatted broadcast radio station licensed to Summersville, West Virginia, serving Nicholas County, West Virginia. WSJE is owned and operated by Evangelist Communications, Inc.
