= WCPI =

- Mcminnville, Tennessee; United States
- Frequency: 91.3 MHz

Programming
- Format: Public affairs programming

Ownership
- Owner: Warren County Educational Foundation, Dr. Norman Rone

History
- Call sign meaning: Warren County Public Information

Technical information
- Facility ID: 70895
- Class: A
- ERP: 1,600 watts
- HAAT: 48.0 meters
- Transmitter coordinates: 35°39′41.00″N 85°45′6.00″W

WCPI (91.3 FM) is a radio station licensed to Mcminnville, Tennessee, United States. The station is owned by Warren County Educational Foundation.
