= KIOE =

Radio station in Utulei, American Samoa

- Utulei Village, American Samoa; American Samoa
- Frequency: 91.3 MHz

Programming
- Language: English
- Format: Religious

Ownership
- Owner: Leone Church of Christ

History
- First air date: May 2011

Technical information
- Licensing authority: FCC
- Facility ID: 177194
- Class: C2
- ERP: 1,500 watts
- HAAT: 413 meters (1,355 ft)
- Transmitter coordinates: 14°19′21″S 170°45′47″W

Links
- Public license information: Public file; LMS

KIOE (91.3 FM) is a non-commercial educational radio station licensed to Utulei, a village on the island of Tutuila in American Samoa, since May 2011. The station's broadcast license is held by Leone Church of Christ.

KIOE broadcasts a religious radio format.

== History ==
In October 2007, Leone Church of Christ applied to the Federal Communications Commission (FCC) for a construction permit for a new broadcast radio station. The FCC granted this permit on May 20, 2008, with a scheduled expiration date of May 20, 2011. The new station was assigned call sign "KIOE" on May 18, 2011. After construction and testing were completed in May 2011, the station was granted its broadcast license on May 24, 2011.
