= KDKR =

Radio station in Decatur, Texas

Coordinates: 33.387°N 97.566°W

Decatur, Texas; United States
- Broadcast area: Dallas-Fort Worth (Greater DFW Metroplex)
- Frequency: 91.3 MHz
- Branding: KDKR 91.3

Programming
- Format: Christian talk and teaching

Ownership
- Owner: Penfold Communications, Inc.
- Sister stations: KYJC

History
- First air date: 1996
- Former call signs: KDTR (1996)
- Call sign meaning: Decatur, Texas

Technical information
- Licensing authority: FCC
- Class: C
- ERP: 40,000 horizontal watts 100,000 vertical watts
- HAAT: 544 meters (1785 ft)

Links
- Public license information: Public file; LMS
- Website: www.kdkr.org

KDKR (91.3 MHz) is a listener-supported FM radio station licensed to Decatur, Texas and broadcasting to northern areas of the Dallas-Fort Worth Metroplex in North Texas. The station is owned by Penfold Communications, Inc., and it airs a Christian talk and teaching radio format. The studios and offices are on Diamond Oaks Drive in Fort Worth.

National and local religious leaders are heard on KDKR, including Chuck Smith, David Jeremiah, Alistair Begg, Charles Stanley and Greg Laurie.

KDKR is also heard on two FM translators, K248BC at 97.5 MHz in Dallas, and K260BP at 99.9 MHz in Irving, Texas.

== Translators ==
Call sign	Frequency	City of license	FID	ERP (W)	HAAT	Class	FCC info
K248BC	(97.5 MHz) FM	Dallas, Texas	138792	50	155 m (509 ft)	D	LMS
K260BP	(99.9 MHz) FM	Irving, Texas	14442	250	77.1 m (253 ft)	D	LMS
