= KMHS-FM =

- Coos Bay, Oregon; United States
- Broadcast area: Coos Bay, OR
- Frequency: 91.3 MHz
- Branding: 90s 2K POP 91.3

Programming
- Format: Pop music (1990's and 2000's)

Ownership
- Owner: Coos Bay School District No. 9; (Coos Bay School Board)
- Sister stations: 1420 AM, 105.1 FM

History
- Call sign meaning: Marshfield High School

Technical information
- Licensing authority: FCC
- Facility ID: 91353
- Class: C3
- ERP: 10,000 watts
- HAAT: −10.0 meters (−32.8 ft)
- Transmitter coordinates: 43°22′7″N 124°12′11″W

Links
- Public license information: Public file; LMS
- Webcast: https://live365.com/station/91-3-KMHS-The-Pirate-a25253

KMHS-FM (91.3 FM, "POP 91.3") is a radio station broadcasting a Pop music format. Licensed to Coos Bay, Oregon, United States, the station is currently owned by Coos Bay School District No. 9. KMHS-FM is a station that is student controlled and it usually plays songs from the 1990's and the 2000's. The songs played are usually the "clean" versions.

== History ==
KMHS-FM was launched in 2008 as Pirate Radio 91.3, airing a hot adult contemporary format.

KMHS-FM returned students to the airwaves in the fall of 2023, after taking them off air during the pandemic. On January 10, 2025, KMHS-FM's format was changed for the first time since going on air. KMHS-FM got changed from adult contemporary to 1990's and 2000's pop music, rebranding to POP 91.3 - The Coast's 90's & 2K Station. Members of the student management team decided on the format change and moniker prior to the Class of 2024's graduation.
