= KHCK =

- Houck, Arizona; United States
- Frequency: 91.3 MHz

Programming
- Format: religious

Ownership
- Owner: Advance Ministries

Technical information
- Licensing authority: FCC
- Facility ID: 177144
- Class: A
- ERP: 200 watts
- HAAT: 1.0 meter (3.3 ft)
- Transmitter coordinates: 35°17′1″N 109°14′51″W

Links
- Public license information: Public file; LMS

KHCK (91.3 FM) is a radio station licensed to Houck, Arizona, United States. The station is currently owned by Advance Ministries.
