= CJLX-FM =

Radio station at Loyalist College in Belleville, Ontario

Coordinates: 44.1559°N 77.42969°W

- Belleville, Ontario; Canada
- Broadcast area: Belleville-Quinte West
- Frequency: 91.3 MHz
- Branding: 91X

Programming
- Format: Campus radio

Ownership
- Owner: Loyalist College Radio Inc.

History
- First air date: November 30, 1992
- Former frequencies: 92.3 MHz (1992–2005)

Technical information
- Class: B1
- ERP: 3.2 kW
- HAAT: 164.1 metres (538 ft)

Links
- Website: 91x.fm

CJLX-FM is a Canadian radio station, which broadcasts at 91.3 FM in Belleville, Ontario. It is the campus radio station of the city's Loyalist College. CJLX was the first frequency in Canada to be granted a campus instructional license, as it is a means of training for students in the school's radio broadcasting and broadcast journalism programs. Though broadcasting from Loyalist College, the station primarily has a community oriented focus, with slightly more emphasis on the college.

== History ==
On November 13, 1990, the CRTC approved an application by Bryan E. Olney, representing a company to be incorporated, for an FM licence at Belleville. The new station would broadcast on a frequency of 92.3 MHz with an effective radiated power of 50 watts. Although commercial advertising is heard on CJLX, it is a not-for-profit radio station, which in turn generates support rather than competition from local broadcasting companies. The licensee was to be a non-profit corporation without share capital, and would be operated by and for the students of Loyalist College. Two closed circuit stations funded by the administration of Loyalist College had been in operation for several years. Loyalist proposed a Group II hard rock format.

The establishment costs for the new station were financed in large part by Quinte Broadcasting Co. Ltd. (CJBQ and CIGL-FM Belleville, and CJTN Trenton). Operating costs would be met largely through continuing grants from college administration, supplemented by fund-raising activities and by revenues earned from restricted advertising to be broadcast on the station. Radio and broadcast journalism students would provide most of the programming.

In 1992, CJLX began testing on October 26 and officially signed on November 30.

In 2004, CJLX was approved by the CRTC to change frequencies to 91.3 MHz and to change the authorized contours by increasing the effective radiated power from 50 watts to 3,400 watts. On October 11, 2005 at midnight, CJLX officially moved to its new current frequency at 91.3 FM. The new stronger signal now covers the entire Quinte region.

== Talent ==
All announcers and news reporters are students of the Radio Broadcasting and Broadcast Journalism courses at Loyalist College.
