= WFIX =

- Florence, Alabama; United States
- Broadcast area: Florence-Muscle Shoals
- Frequency: 91.3 MHz
- Branding: The Fix

Programming
- Format: Contemporary Christian

Ownership
- Owner: Tri-State Inspirational Broadcasting

History
- Former call signs: WWOL (1986–1987); WBHL (1987–2000)
- Call sign meaning: "Fix"

Technical information
- Licensing authority: FCC
- Facility ID: 67799
- Class: C1
- ERP: 100,000 watts
- HAAT: 265 meters (869 feet)
- Transmitter coordinates: 34°40′24″N 87°42′56″W

Links
- Public license information: Public file; LMS
- Website: wfix.net

WFIX (91.3 FM, "The Fix") is a radio station licensed to serve Florence, Alabama, United States. The station is owned by Tri-State Inspirational Broadcasting and serves the greater Florence-Muscle Shoals area. It airs a Contemporary Christian music format.

The station was assigned the WFIX call letters by the Federal Communications Commission on June 23, 2000.

Daily Programming:

- "The Morning Fix" hosted by Mark & Michelle (6 am - 10 am)
- "Middays With Michelle" hosted by Michelle Pyle (10 am - 2 pm)
- "Afternoon Drive" hosted by Heath (2 pm - 6 pm)
- "The Fix Night Time" hosted by James Dancer (6 pm - 12 am)
- "The Over Nights" (12 am - 4 am)
- "In His Presence" (4 am - 6 am)

Other Active Personalities:

- Richard Parker
- Casey Jones
- James Moody
- Allen Stout

Former Personalities:

- David Michael
- Christy Pepper
- Mike West
- John David Crow
- Wade Hacker
- Jason Fox
- Kris Kelly
