= KMHA =

Four Bears, North Dakota; United States
- Frequency: 91.3 MHz
- Branding: Alternative 91

Programming
- Format: Variety
- Affiliations: AIROS Native Radio Network

Ownership
- Owner: Fort Berthold Communications Enterprises

History
- Call sign meaning: Mandan, Hidatsa, Arikara; the three affiliated tribes of the Fort Berthold Indian Reservation

Technical information
- Licensing authority: FCC
- Facility ID: 22806
- Class: C1
- ERP: 97,000 watts
- HAAT: 137 meters
- Transmitter coordinates: 47°44′23″N 102°43′24″W

Links
- Public license information: Public file; LMS

KMHA (91.3 FM, "Alternative 91") is a radio station licensed to serve Four Bears, North Dakota. This station is owned by Fort Berthold Communications Enterprises, and airs a Variety format including programming from Native Public Media.

The station was assigned the callsign KMHA by the Federal Communications Commission on May 10, 1982.
