= WSEB =

- Englewood, Florida; United States
- Broadcast area: Venice; Port Charlotte; Sarasota
- Frequency: 91.3 MHz

Programming
- Format: Christian radio with southern gospel

Ownership
- Owner: Suncoast Educational Broadcasting Corp.

History
- First air date: May 1989
- Call sign meaning: Suncoast Educational Broadcasting (owner)

Technical information
- Licensing authority: FCC
- Facility ID: 63899
- Class: C1
- ERP: 62,000 watts (horiz.); 60,000 watts (vert.)
- HAAT: 86 meters (282 ft)
- Transmitter coordinates: 26°51′48.00″N 82°17′54.00″W

Links
- Public license information: Public file; LMS
- Webcast: Listen live
- Website: wsebfm.com

WSEB (91.3 FM) is a non-commercial radio station licensed to Englewood, Florida, United States, and serving the Venice, Port Charlotte, and Sarasota areas of the Gulf Coast of Florida. Owned by the Suncoast Educational Broadcasting Corporation, it features a Christian format of talk and preaching programs and southern gospel music.

Studios are located on West Dearborn Street in Englewood, and the transmitter is sited near Rotonda West in Charlotte County. It signed on the air in May 1989.
