= KKJD =

- Borrego Springs, California; United States
- Frequency: 91.3 MHz
- Branding: KKJD Radio 91.3FM

Programming
- Format: Christian radio

Ownership
- Owner: Borrego Springs Christian Center

History
- First air date: 2013
- Former call signs: KKJD-LP (2005–2013)
- Former frequencies: 99.3 MHz (2005–2007); 99.1 MHz (2007–2013)

Technical information
- Licensing authority: FCC
- Facility ID: 172590
- Class: A
- ERP: 190 watts
- HAAT: −352 meters (−1,155 ft)
- Transmitter coordinates: 33°14′39.1″N 116°22′33″W

Links
- Public license information: Public file; LMS
- Webcast: Listen live
- Website: kkjdradio.com

KKJD (91.3 FM) is a radio station broadcasting a Christian radio format from Borrego Springs, California. The station is owned by Borrego Springs Christian Center.

== History ==
The station was assigned the call sign KKJD August 31, 2012.

Borrengo Springs Christian Center previously owned a low-power FM station in Borrego Springs, KKJD-LP (99.1 FM). After KKJD (91.3 FM) went on the air, the KKJD-LP license was returned to the Federal Communications Commission (FCC) for cancellation on July 12, 2013.
