= WPFG (FM) =

Coordinates: 40°16′35″N 77°16′39″W

- Carlisle, Pennsylvania; United States
- Broadcast area: Harrisburg–Carlisle metropolitan statistical area
- Frequency: 91.3 MHz
- Branding: The Bridge

Programming
- Format: Christian radio

Ownership
- Owner: Cumberland Valley Christian Radio

History
- Call sign meaning: With Praise For God

Technical information
- Licensing authority: FCC
- Facility ID: 93234
- Class: A
- ERP: 600 watts
- HAAT: 253 meters (830 ft)
- Translator: 93.1 W226AS (Shermans Dale)

Links
- Public license information: Public file; LMS
- Website: wpfgfm.org

WPFG is a Christian radio station licensed to Carlisle, Pennsylvania, broadcasting on 91.3 FM. The station serves the Harrisburg–Carlisle metropolitan statistical area and is owned by Cumberland Valley Christian Radio.

WPFG's programming includes Christian talk and teaching shows such as Grace to You with John MacArthur, Revive our Hearts with Nancy Leigh DeMoss, Truth for Life with Alistair Begg, Renewing Your Mind with R.C. Sproul, and Answers in Genesis with Ken Ham.
