= KXRP =

- Bismarck, North Dakota; United States
- Frequency: 91.3 MHz

Programming
- Format: Country

Ownership
- Owner: Central Dakota Enterprises, Inc.
- Sister stations: KNDR

History
- Former call signs: KBFR (2002–2014)
- Former frequencies: 91.7 MHz (2004–2016)

Technical information
- Licensing authority: FCC
- Facility ID: 90269
- Class: A
- ERP: 4200 watts
- HAAT: 196 meters (643 ft)
- Transmitter coordinates: 46°35′23″N 100°47′38.60″W
- Translator: (89.1 MHz) K206EI (Williston)

Links
- Public license information: Public file; LMS
- Website: kndr.fm

KXRP (91.3 FM) is a non-commercial radio station broadcasting a Country format. Licensed to Bismarck, North Dakota, United States, the station is currently owned by Central Dakota Enterprises, Inc.
