= KUCA (FM) =

- Conway, Arkansas; United States
- Frequency: 91.3 MHz
- Branding: The Bear 91.3

Programming
- Format: College radio; hot adult contemporary

Ownership
- Owner: University of Central Arkansas

History
- First air date: October 10, 1966
- Former call signs: KASC (1966–1975)
- Former frequencies: 91.5 MHz
- Call sign meaning: University of Central Arkansas

Technical information
- Licensing authority: FCC
- Facility ID: 69401
- Class: A
- ERP: 5,000 watts
- Transmitter coordinates: 35°2′55.3″N 92°27′49.5″W

Links
- Public license information: Public file; LMS
- Website: uca.edu/kuca/

KUCA (91.3 FM) is the student-run radio station of the University of Central Arkansas (UCA) in Conway, Arkansas, United States.

== History ==
The then-Arkansas State Teachers College applied on May 7, 1966, to build a new noncommercial FM radio station which would operate with 10 watts on 91.5 MHz. A construction permit was granted on August 9, 1966, and two months later, KASC debuted as the second noncommercial radio station in Arkansas. It initially broadcast seven hours a day, six days a week. KASC was not the first radio station to be located at the college: the short-lived FM station KOWN and its successor KCON (1230 AM) were both housed at the Main Building, and the relocation of the latter allowed space for the establishment of a noncommercial outlet. The call letters were changed to KUCA in April 1975 after the then-State College of Arkansas was elevated to university status.

When it began broadcasting, the station had an easy listening music format; by the 1990s, KUCA mostly broadcast public radio programs from NPR and the BBC. Agitation for a more student-operated radio station—which initially targeted a format change at KUCA—would find expression on campus when the commercial owners of KCON shut the station down and donated the license to UCA in 1998. However, the university soon moved to convert KUCA into a student-run outlet. In 2001, citing the increased availability of its classical and folk music from other stations and an inability to capture a significant classical audience already loyal to other stations, the university announced it would shutter KUCA and redirect its funds to establish "new media". This did not come to pass, and KUCA was instead folded into the student-run group. In 2007, KCON was closed down to permit the use of its transmitter site for UCA expansion, and its UCA sports programming moved to the FM station.

On Tuesday, July 11, 2023, KUCA closed all operations from their old offices and studios in the basement and went live from their new state of the art studio on the main floor of the Ronnie Williams Student Center in the heart of UCA’s campus. The station has an expanded music library now spanning the 80s, 90s, early 2000s, with the hits of today in rotation as well. KUCA continues to air UCA athletics events throughout the year, and also began streaming full time in the fall of 2022 on their own UCA website along with being featured on the TuneIn app.
