= WAMM (1230 AM) =

- Woodstock, Virginia; United States
- Broadcast area: Woodstock, Virginia; Shenandoah County, Virginia
- Frequency: 1230 kHz
- Branding: Americana Music Project

Programming
- Format: Americana

Ownership
- Owner: Shenandoah Valley Group, Inc.
- Sister stations: WSVG (790 AM)

History
- First air date: October 9, 1981
- Last air date: September 30, 2019
- Former call signs: WAMM (1981–2019); WSVG (2019)

Technical information
- Facility ID: 16000
- Class: C
- Power: 1,000 watts daytime; 250 watts nighttime
- Transmitter coordinates: 38°51′15.2″N 78°31′25.1″W

WAMM (1230 AM) was a broadcast radio station licensed to Woodstock, Virginia, serving Woodstock and Shenandoah County, Virginia. WAMM was last owned and operated by Shenandoah Valley Group, Inc. Its license was cancelled on October 1, 2019, as WSVG.

== History ==
Peggy Boston and Joan Anderson, two retired Washington Star reporters, formed Hometown Radio to purchase WAMM from Grass Roots Broadcasting in May 2002. They instituted an all-local adult standards format branded "Radio Retro". However, the older audience made advertising difficult to sell, and the station went silent on May 2, 2005, from mounting debts. The standards continued for a time on Hometown's other property, WSVG (790 AM). WAMM was sold to Harrisonburg businessman Jason Rodriguez, who launched a tropical format as "Radio Latino" in October 2005. The station went silent again on October 7, 2008, citing financial reasons, and was continuously silent until November 2009 except for a 10-day period in September of that year; licenses are deleted by law after one continuous year of silence. In December 2009, WAMM was sold to Shenandoah Valley Group, Inc., who had also purchased WSVG and used WAMM to simulcast its news-talk format.

Shenandoah Valley Group took WAMM silent on December 3, 2014, citing technical issues. In the following three years, the station only broadcast in July–August 2015, after which it was taken silent again due to further technical issues, and September 2016, when Shenandoah Valley Group reported financial distress. WAMM resumed operations once more on September 16, 2017, and was again simulcasting WSVG.

On January 16, 2018, the station was granted a construction permit for FM translator W293DH on 106.5 FM in Woodstock, pursuant to the Federal Communications Commission's AM revitalization program. On September 30, 2019, its call sign was changed to WSVG, the same day its license was surrendered. Its sister station, AM 790, took the WAMM call sign.
