= KBFR (FM) =

Radio station in Desert Center, California (2013–2016)

Desert Center, California; United States
- Frequency: 101.1 MHz

Programming
- Format: Defunct

Ownership
- Owner: Sunnylands Broadcasting, LLC

History
- First air date: July 25, 2013; 12 years ago
- Last air date: January 22, 2016; 10 years ago
- Former call signs: KNBQ (2013–2015)

Technical information
- Licensing authority: FCC
- Facility ID: 190371
- Class: A
- ERP: 1 kw
- HAAT: −110 meters (−360 ft)
- Transmitter coordinates: 33°43′10″N 115°23′42″W

Links
- Public license information: Public file; LMS

KBFR was a class A radio station in Desert Center, California, licensed to Sunnylands Broadcasting, LLC.

== History ==
KBFR began broadcasting as KNBQ on July 25, 2013. On February 12, 2015, the call sign changed to KBFR.

KBFR went silent on January 22, 2016, for technical reasons. On December 12, 2016, Sunnylands Broadcasting surrendered the station's license to the Federal Communications Commission (FCC). The FCC cancelled KBFR's license on December 19, 2016.
