= WIOZ-FM =

- Southern Pines, North Carolina; United States
- Frequency: 102.5 MHz
- Branding: Soft Rock Star 102.5

Programming
- Format: Adult contemporary
- Affiliations: Premiere Radio Networks

Ownership
- Owner: Meridian Communications. L.L.C.

History
- First air date: 1995
- Former call signs: WAHP (1994–1995)
- Former frequencies: 107.1 MHz (1973–1987); 106.9 MHz (1987–1995)

Technical information
- Licensing authority: FCC
- Facility ID: 25204
- Class: A
- ERP: 3,400 watts
- HAAT: 133 meters
- Transmitter coordinates: 35°9′4.00″N 79°28′40.00″W

Links
- Public license information: Public file; LMS
- Webcast: Listen Live
- Website: star1025fm.com

WIOZ-FM (102.5 FM) is a radio station broadcasting an adult contemporary format. Licensed to Southern Pines, North Carolina, United States, the station is currently owned by Meridian Communications. L.L.C. and features programming from Premiere Radio Networks.

== History ==
WIOZ-FM started out at 107.1 MHz in 1973, with a 3,000-watt signal. It was originally owned by Bill Gaston and was the first FM station in Moore County. One of the first morning men was Ned Champion, who had worked at WPTF in Raleigh and was the voice of NC Department of Agriculture Farm News, distributed to various stations in NC. The music format was top 40 in morning drive time and easy listening the rest of the broadcast day. Somewhere around 1987, the station changed frequency to 106.9 MHz and the format became more easy listening. In 1995, WIOZ moved to 102.5 FM, which had been WAHP. The move to 102.5 meant a decrease in power from 50,000 to 6,000 watts. The switch to the current name and format came in 1999.
