= WAMM (AM) =

- Mount Jackson, Virginia; United States
- Broadcast area: Woodstock, Virginia; Shenandoah County, Virginia
- Frequency: 790 kHz
- Branding: Americana Music Project

Programming
- Format: Americana

Ownership
- Owner: Shenandoah Valley Group, Inc.

History
- First air date: 1954
- Former call signs: WSIG (1954–1988); WSVG (1988–2019)

Technical information
- Licensing authority: FCC
- Facility ID: 60106
- Class: D
- Power: 1,000 watts (daytime); 40 watts (nighttime)
- Transmitter coordinates: 38°46′15.4″N 78°37′16.1″W
- Translator: 97.9 W250CR (Mount Jackson)

Links
- Public license information: Public file; LMS
- Webcast: Listen live
- Website: wamm.online

WAMM is a country and Americana formatted broadcast radio station licensed to Mount Jackson, Virginia, serving Woodstock and Shenandoah County, Virginia. WAMM is owned and operated by Shenandoah Valley Group, Inc.

== History ==
In January 2004, the then-WSVG applied to move to Grottoes, Virginia, in the larger Harrisonburg-Staunton-Waynesboro market. A sale to Shenandoah Valley Television, then the owner of WBOP (106.3 FM) and WSIG (96.9 FM) in that market, fell through later in the year; then-owners Hometown Radio of Mount Jackson allowed the application to expire afterwards.

On July 6, 2009, Shenandoah Valley Group, Inc. bought WSVG for $175,000.

WSVG flipped to an Americana music format, consisting largely of country music with rock mixed in, during October 2016. Previously, it had run a local news/talk format with sports coverage. On January 26, 2018, WSVG was granted a construction permit for FM translator W250CR on 97.9 in Mount Jackson, pursuant to the Federal Communications Commission's AM revitalization program; the translator signed on in January 2021. On September 30, the station's call sign was changed to WAMM.
