= 103.7 FM =

FM radio frequency

The following radio stations broadcast on FM frequency 103.7 MHz:

== Argentina ==
- Metropolitana in Rosario, Santa Fe
- Radio María in Pilar, Santa Fe

== Australia ==
- 2KY in Moree, New South Wales
- 2NUR in Newcastle, New South Wales
- 3WAY in Warrnambool, Victoria
- 4MBS in Brisbane, Queensland
- ABC Classic in Broken Hill, New South Wales
- ABC Classic in Swan Hill, Victoria
- 3MRR in Mansfield, Victoria
- 7LTN in Launceston, Tasmania
- Radio TAB in Longreach, Queensland

== Canada (Channel 279) ==
- CBF-FM-19 in La Tuque, Quebec
- CBPD-FM in Port Hardy, British Columbia
- CBVB-FM in Chandler, Quebec
- CBZA-FM in Grand Manan, New Brunswick
- CFBU-FM in St. Catharines, Ontario
- CFID-FM in Acton Vale, Quebec
- CFVR-FM in Fort McMurray, Alberta
- CHFA-7-FM in Falher, Alberta
- CHHP-FM in Cypress Hills Provincial Park, Saskatchewan
- CHPV-FM in Scotstown, Quebec
- CHWH-FM in West Hawk Lake, Manitoba
- CIEL-FM in Riviere-Du-Loup, Quebec
- CJPT-FM in Brockville, Ontario
- CKGF-3-FM in Rock Creek, British Columbia
- CKQK-FM-1 in Elmira, Prince Edward Island
- CKRK-FM in Kahnawake, Quebec
- CKUA-FM-8 in Edson, Alberta
- VF2373 in New Denver, British Columbia
- VF2559 in Pemberton, British Columbia

== China ==
- CNR The Voice of China in Chengdu and Ji'an
- SMG Love Music 103.7 in Shanghai
- GRT News Radio in Enping, Jiangmen

== Ireland ==
- C103 in north County Cork

== Laos ==
- LNR Radio 1 in Vientiane

== Malaysia ==
- Era in Ipoh, Kuala Kangsar, Central Perak, South Perak, Hilir Perak and North Selangor
- Labuan FM in Labuan
- Melody in Kuching, Sarawak
- Raaga in Johor Bahru, Johor and Singapore

== Mexico ==
- XHCEL-FM in Celaya (Praderas de la Soledad), Guanajuato
- XHCME-FM in Melchor Ocampo, Estado de México
- XHCS-FM in Veracruz, Veracruz
- XHDGO-FM in Durango, Durango
- XHEMU-FM in Piedras Negras, Coahuila
- XHTKR-FM in Monterrey, Nuevo León
- XHGYM-FM in Guaymas, Sonora
- XHHEM-FM in Chihuahua, Chihuahua
- XHIR-FM in Ciudad Valles, San Luis Potosí
- XHHUI-FM in Huichapan, Hidalgo
- XHMR-FM in Aguascalientes, Aguascalientes
- XHPATZ-FM in Pátzcuaro, Michoacán
- XHQY-FM in Toluca, Estado de México
- XHWL-FM in Nuevo Laredo, Tamaulipas
- XHZPC-FM in Jojutla, Morelos

== Laos ==
- Lao National Radio

== Philippines ==
• DYRX in Roxas

== Russia ==
- Radio MAXIMUM in Moscow

== United Kingdom ==
- BBC CWR in South Warwickshire and Gaydon
- BBC Radio Newcastle in the Tees Valley
- BBC Radio Wales
- BBC Radio York in Malton, Pocklington and York
- Channel 103 in Jersey, Channel Islands.

=== Isle of Man ===
- Manx Radio in Jurby

== United States (Channel 279) ==
- KABZ in Little Rock, Arkansas
- KAKR in Akron, Colorado
- KAXA in Mountain Home, Texas
- KBTT in Haughton, Louisiana
- KCDD in Hamlin, Texas
- KDAD in Victor, Idaho
- KDKL in Okemah, Oklahoma
- KEYN in Wichita, Kansas
- KFBT in Hanford, California
- KGIM in Redfield, South Dakota
- KHJK in La Porte, Texas
- KHTP in Tacoma, Washington
- KIHL-LP in Hilo, Hawaii
- KIQQ in Newberry Springs, California
- KJEL in Lebanon, Missouri
- KKBJ in Bemidji, Minnesota
- KKSG-LP in Worland, Wyoming
- KLKE in Garberville, California
- KLKK in Clear Lake, Iowa
- KLNN in Questa, New Mexico
- KLWB-FM in Carencro, Louisiana
- KLZZ in Waite Park, Minnesota
- KMHK in Billings, Montana
- KMLA in El Rio, California
- KNMZ in Alamogordo, New Mexico
- KNRQ in Harrisburg, Oregon
- KODS in Carnelian Bay, California
- KOSF in San Francisco, California
- KPAR-LP in Dickinson, North Dakota
- KPZA-FM in Jal, New Mexico
- KQBM-LP in West Point, California
- KQLT in Casper, Wyoming
- KRDX in Corona de Tucson, Arizona
- KRRO in Sioux Falls, South Dakota
- KSNN in Ridgway, Colorado
- KSON in San Diego, California
- KVIL in Highland Park-Dallas, Texas
- KWEP-LP in Elk Park, Montana
- KWJV-LP in Weslaco, Texas
- KWOL-LP in Arroyo Grande, California
- KXAI in Odem, Texas
- KXKT in Glenwood, Iowa
- KXZK in Vail, Arizona
- KYVA-FM in Grants, New Mexico
- KZAI in Balcones Heights, Texas
- KZGL in Flagstaff, Arizona
- WBMQ in Metter, Georgia
- WCBJ in Campton, Kentucky
- WCIR in Beckley, West Virginia
- WCKY in Pemberville, Ohio
- WCSY in South Haven, Michigan
- WCXR in Lewisburg, Pennsylvania
- WCZE in Harbor Beach, Michigan
- WDBR in Springfield, Illinois
- WEEO in Mcconnellsburg, Pennsylvania
- WFAG-LP in Valdosta, Georgia
- WFFX in Hattiesburg, Mississippi
- WFGS in Murray, Kentucky
- WFIU in Bloomington, Indiana
- WFRT in Frankfort, Kentucky
- WFSJ-LP in Indiana, Pennsylvania
- WGON-LP in Slidell, Louisiana
- WGOO-LP in Fremont, Indiana
- WHHT in Cave City, Kentucky
- WHYB in Menominee, Michigan
- WHZR in Royal Center, Indiana
- WILT in Wrightsville Beach, North Carolina
- WJAF-LP in Centralia, Illinois
- WKNE in Keene, New Hampshire
- WKXJ in Walden, Tennessee
- WLLR in Davenport, Iowa
- WLTC in Cusseta, Georgia
- WMGM in Atlantic City, New Jersey
- WNNJ in Newton, New Jersey
- WPKQ in North Conway, New Hampshire
- WPVD in Westerly, Rhode Island
- WPVM-LP in Asheville, North Carolina
- WQEN in Trussville, Alabama
- WQNY in Ithaca, New York
- WQOL in Vero Beach, Florida
- WQWV in Fisher, West Virginia
- WRHD in Williamston, North Carolina
- WRPC-LP in Hampton, Virginia
- WRTS in Erie, Pennsylvania
- WRUF in Gainesville, Florida
- WRUX-LP in Atlanta, Georgia
- WSJH in Hubbardston, Michigan
- WSNH-LP in Grand Rapids, Michigan
- WSOC in Charlotte, North Carolina
- WTIB in Williamston, North Carolina
- WULS in Broxton, Georgia
- WURV in Richmond, Virginia
- WUVS-LP in Muskegon, Michigan
- WVKX in Irwinton, Georgia
- WWIB in Hallie, Wisconsin
- WXCY-FM in Havre de Grace, Maryland
- WXKT in Royston, Georgia
- WXLX in Lajas, Puerto Rico
- WXSS in Wauwatosa, Wisconsin
- WYUR in Gilman, Illinois
- WZVL in Philo, Ohio

== Uruguay ==
- CXD279 in Montevideo
