= 1360 AM =

AM radio frequency

The following radio stations broadcast on AM frequency 1360 kHz: 1360 AM is a regional broadcast frequency. Class B and D stations broadcast on 1360 AM.

== Argentina ==
- AM 1360 in Maria Grande, Entre Rios (still have no callsign assigned)

== Mexico ==
- XEZON-AM in Zongolica, Veracruz

== United States ==
Call sign	City of license	Facility ID	Class	Daytime power (kW)	Nighttime power (kW)	Unlimited power (kW)	Transmitter coordinates
KACT	Andrews, Texas	74562	B	1	0.24		32.347222°N 102.556389°W
KBKB	Fort Madison, Iowa	64567	D	1	0.034		40.658333°N 91.272222°W
KBUY	Ruidoso, New Mexico	70826	D	5	0.201		33.326111°N 105.670556°W
KFFA	Helena, Arkansas	16520	D	1	0.09		34.5275°N 90.63°W
KFIV	Modesto, California	12959	B	4	0.95		37.689722°N 120.953333°W
KGMR	Clarksville, Arkansas	22056	D	0.5	0.098		35.4725°N 93.491111°W
KHNC	Johnstown, Colorado	17183	B	10	1		40.386389°N 104.905278°W
KKBJ	Bemidji, Minnesota	9665	B	5	2.5		47.442222°N 94.865833°W
KKMO	Tacoma, Washington	33301	B			5	47.305278°N 122.4425°W
KKTX	Corpus Christi, Texas	55166	B			1	27.800278°N 97.461389°W
KLSD	San Diego, California	34452	B	5	1		32.730278°N 117.083611°W
KMJM	Cedar Rapids, Iowa	54164	D	1	0.124		41.924444°N 91.615278°W
KMNY	Hurst, Texas	10825	B	50	0.89		32.774444°N 96.964722°W
KMRN	Cameron, Missouri	50744	D	0.5	0.025		39.684722°N 94.239444°W
KNGN	McCook, Nebraska	65925	D	1			40.222222°N 100.693611°W
KNIR	New Iberia, Louisiana	6349	D	1	0.209		30.025556°N 91.822222°W
KOHU	Hermiston, Oregon	27077	B	4.3	0.5		45.865833°N 119.3125°W
KPHN	El Dorado, Kansas	48538	B	1	0.24		37.813056°N 96.812222°W
KPXQ	Glendale, Arizona	55912	B	50	1		33.507778°N 112.216944°W
KRKK	Rock Springs, Wyoming	5301	B	5	1		41.62°N 109.238889°W
KRWC	Buffalo, Minnesota	17283	D	0.5	0.027		45.166667°N 93.919722°W
KSCJ	Sioux City, Iowa	21691	B	5	5		42.556667°N 96.336667°W
KTNZ	Amarillo, Texas	48509	B	6	0.32		35.2425°N 101.784167°W (daytime); 35.242222°N 101.783889°W (nighttime)
KWDJ	Ridgecrest, California	30157	D	1	0.031		35.616111°N 117.643056°W
KWWJ	Baytown, Texas	58724	B	5	1		29.774444°N 95.015278°W
WBLC	Lenoir City, Tennessee	36691	D	1	1		35.792222°N 84.295833°W
WBMZ	Metter, Georgia	54676	D	1	0.059		32.398889°N 82.043333°W
WCGL	Jacksonville, Florida	30609	D	5	0.089		30.275833°N 81.636667°W
WCGX	Galax, Virginia	68600	D	5	0.031		36.663333°N 80.914444°W
WCHL	Chapel Hill, North Carolina	70191	B	5	1		35.938333°N 79.026667°W
WDRC	Hartford, Connecticut	7711	B	5	5		41.813056°N 72.696111°W (daytime); 41.813056°N 72.696667°W (nighttime)
WELP	Easley, South Carolina	27423	D	5	0.036		34.839444°N 82.638889°W
WFLW	Monticello, Kentucky	63324	D	1	0.02		36.837222°N 84.863889°W
WGBN	McKeesport, Pennsylvania	59695	B	1	1		40.311389°N 79.849722°W
WGJK	Rome, Georgia	7044	D	0.5	0.047		34.270833°N 85.183333°W
WHBG	Harrisonburg, Virginia	72143	D	5	0.009		38.451111°N 78.908056°W
WHJC	Matewan, West Virginia	67038	D	1			37.617222°N 82.167778°W
WHNR	Cypress Gardens, Florida	21766	B	5	2.5		28.021111°N 81.700556°W
WIXI	Jasper, Alabama	60508	D	12	0.042		33.82°N 87.273889°W
WKMI	Kalamazoo, Michigan	14659	B	5	1		42.326667°N 85.525833°W
WKYO	Caro, Michigan	29679	B	1	1		43.458889°N 83.394167°W
WLBK	DeKalb, Illinois	16410	D	1	0.024		41.938333°N 88.750833°W
WLWE	Roanoke, Alabama	18134	D	1	0.054		33.183889°N 85.405833°W
WLYN	Lynn, Massachusetts	53948	D	0.7	0.076		42.452778°N 70.980556°W
WMOV	Ravenswood, West Virginia	24585	D	5			38.965556°N 81.766389°W
WNAH	Nashville, Tennessee	27079	D	1	0.027		36.191667°N 86.773889°W
WOEN	Olean, New York	19708	D	1	0.03		42.105°N 78.390278°W
WPPA	Pottsville, Pennsylvania	53134	B	5	0.5		40.698889°N 76.195278°W
WQVN	North Miami, Florida	27713	B	9.3	0.4		25.839444°N 80.189722°W
WSAI	Cincinnati, Ohio	41994	B	5	5		39.2475°N 84.531111°W
WTAQ	Green Bay, Wisconsin	42086	B	10	5		44.430833°N 88.080833°W
WTOC	Newton, New Jersey	25414	B	2	0.32		41.039444°N 74.738611°W
WVRQ	Viroqua, Wisconsin	57257	D	1	0.023		43.534444°N 90.873056°W
WWOW	Conneaut, Ohio	13724	D	5	0.035		41.925556°N 80.542222°W
