= List of public art in Tasmania =

This is a list of public art on permanent public display in Tasmania, Australia.

The list applies only to works of public art accessible in an outdoor public space; it does not include artwork on display inside museums. Public art may include sculptures, statues, monuments, memorials, murals and mosaics.

== List ==
Year	Subject	Image	Artist	Location	Notes	Ref
1865	Fountain and statue of John Franklin			Franklin Square 42.883247°S 147.330191°E		
C. 1884			Richard Patterson	St David's Park 42.885325°S 147.328804°E	One of the lion gate posts at the entrance to St David's Park.	
1885	Charles Meredith Monument Fountain			Queens Domain 42.876017°S 147.333619°E		
1889	Statue of William Crowther		Mario Raggi	Franklin Square 42.8833892°S 147.3297775°E		
1902, 1925, and after 1945	Ross War Memorial			Ross 42.030995°S 147.492118°E	A memorial to Albert Fitzallen and World War I and II	
1902 and 1904	Launceston Boer War Memorial			City Park, Launceston 41.433010101318°S 147.14215087891°E	South African War Memorial The stone was laid in 1902, the memorial unveiled in 1904.	
1913	Anniversary Arch		Amos Vimpany	Royal Tasmanian Botanical Gardens 42.864902°S 147.329899°E	Originally, it was created for the entrance of the Australian Mutual Provident Society's building in Elizabeth Street, at the site of NAB House. After the building was demolished, it was donated to the gardens in 1968 to mark the 150th anniversary of the founding of the gardens.	
1920				Queenstown 42.079402°S 145.555158°E	War memorial	
1922	Statue of Edward VII			Franklin Square 42.883217°S 147.329873°E		
1924	For God and Country			Close to The Queen Victoria Art Gallery, Launceston 41.438625°S 147.133355°E	Launceston Cenotaph	
1924	War memorial Ulverstone			Ulverstone 41.157677400005°S 146.175794°E		
1925	Hobart Cenotaph			Queens Domain 42.877356°S 147.335758°E	A war memorial	
1927				Stanley 40.761703°S 145.29615°E	War memorial	
1935	Alfred B Biggs' Observatory Monument			Royal Park, Launceston 41.4385391610°S 147.132066567°E	A bronze plaque on a granite plinth	
1948	Albert Ogilvie		Stanley Hammond	Parliament House Gardens 42.885963°S 147.330895°E		
1961	Fern Tree Bower			Wellington Park 42.917778°S 147.2475°E	Memorial stones commemorate Mayor Henry Cook and the Hobart Town Corporation Waterworks.	
1968	Spring Landscape		Stephen Walker			
1972	French Memorial Fountain		Stephen Walker	Royal Tasmanian Botanical Gardens 42.865168°S 147.33358°E	It is made of Huon Pine, and representing the bow and sails of a French ship.	
1978	Launceston Quadrant Mall Well			Quadrant Mall, Launceston 41.4372363818°S 147.139467250°E		
1979	Journey to Southland		Stephen Walker	Salamanca Square Fountain 42.887373°S 147.332639°E	Circular concrete fountain containing various bronze sculptural forms. It was originally located at Risdon Cove.	
1983	Monument to early surveyors of Tasmania			Off the Lyell Highway, Bronte Park 42.180021°S 146.50156°E		
1988	Bust of Roald Amundsen			Castray Esplanade, Battery Point 42.886201°S 147.335058°E	Outside of Institute for Marine and Antarctic Studies.	
1988	The Tasman Fountain		Stephen Walker	Salamanca Place 42.8863223°S 147.3315884°E		
1990	Bright Prospect		Ian McKay	Outside the Tasmanian Museum and Art Gallery on Macquarie Street 42.8816468°S 147.3319289°E	Bright Steel	
1991	Pageant in Time		Stephen Walker	Burnie City Council, Burnie 41.053103°S 145.906196°E		
1992			Stephen Walker	Launceston, Tasmania 41.4358998370°S 147.137431661°E	It is to commemorate the sesquicentennial of the first publication of The Examiner magazine.	
1992	International Wall of Friendship		Rene Rime	Collins Street 42.8855324°S 147.325343°E		
1994	Huskies Memorial		Dan Tucker	Out front of Mawson's Huts Replica 42.8830191°S 147.3322631°E	Bronze	
1996	Fish out of Water		Patrick Hall	Elizabeth Street Mall 42.8818442°S 147.3283647°E	It's a drinking fountain.	
1996	Maurice the Pig		Patrick Hall	Elizabeth Street Mall 42.8818245°S 147.3282929°E		
1996	Thompson the Dog		Patrick Hall	Elizabeth Street Mall 42.8817619°S 147.3281227°E		
1998 and 2002	Heading South		Stephen Walker	Near Macquarie Wharf 42.882247°S 147.334998°E	Bronze It has several components, including Seals and Penguins unveiled in 1998, and The Bernacchi Tribute unveiled in 2002.	
2002	Stratose		John Smith, Penny Smith, and Milan Milojevic	Liffey Falls Conservation Area, Liffey Falls		
2002	Sculptures of Great Western Tiers		Paul Noordanus	Deloraine	These are 7 sculptures from 15 different artists and scattered along the countryside mainly on the sides of Deloraine's main street. They are mounted on old oxygen cylinders.	
2006	Sculpture of Ronald Campbell Gunn		Peter Corlett	City Park, Launceston 41.433597564697°S 147.14280700684°E	Bronze	
2007	Earth Drill		David Hamilton	Queen Victoria Museum and Art Gallery, Launceston 41.4372511318°S 147.133855454°E	Painted steel	
2013	Statue of Eliza Forlong		Peter Corlett	Valentine Park, Campbell Town 41.928252°S 147.493932°E		
2014	Happy Birthday Mr President xo		Gillie and Marc	Salamanca Square, Battery Point 42.887299°S 147.332259°E	Bronze	
2017	Two Islands		Nigel Helyer	Franklin Square 42.883536°S 147.330322°E	Timber, steel, lighting and sound technology	
2017	Footsteps Towards Freedom		Rowan Gillespie	Hunter Street, Macquarie Wharf 42°52′54.74640″S 147°20′8.68200″E	It is made of four sculptures commemorate the convict women and their children who were transported to Van Diemen's Land (Tasmania).	
2021	From the Shadows			Out front of Cascades Female Factory 42.8942431°S 147.2993476°E	Martha Gregory's statue represents all convict women, especially convict mothers.	
	St David`s Park Memorial WallsPrint Page			St David's Park 42.8863378°S 147.3291665°E	This memorial walls are made up of many of the original headstones from the park’s previous life as the Hobart colony’s first cemetery.	
	1833			Battery Point 42.886687°S 147.334659°E	Shoulder-high steel gabions filled with sandstone. It is a part of the Battery Point Sculpture Trail.	
	Seahorse			Mures Lower Deck restaurant, Hobart 42.882191°S 147.333741°E	It is the restaurant's ornament.	
	Progress			Queen Victoria Museum and Art Gallery, Launceston 41.4373950591°S 147.133344925°E		
	Big Platypus			Australian Axeman's Hall of Fame, Latrobe 41.2311513°S 146.4019454°E		
	Guard Dog			Eaglehawk Neck		
	Children of the World		Keith Smith	Penguin General Cemetery	4.5 metes height. The Penguin community fund-raised to purchase this art piece to celebrate the lives of its many unnamed children.	
	Lascar Monument to Port Arthur massacre			Tarleton Street, Port Arthur 43.1464049°S 147.851494°E		
	Crest of the Van Diemen's Land Company			Current location of the Metro Cinemas 41.0516724°S 145.9027757°E	It was originally located on Van Diemen's Land Company building near the Port of Burnie. Today is displayed outside of the Burnie Regional Museum.	
	Burnie Water Sculpture			West Beach in Burnie 41.049181°S 145.905563°E		
	World Globe			Shropshire Park, Ulverstone 41.1527316°S 146.16984220001°E	The globe becomes a visual aid for the written material at the park explaining all the battles that took place for those interested.	
	Whale			Recherche Bay, Cockle Creek	Bronze	
				Macquarie Street 42.8850393°S 147.327409°E		
				Port Latta 40.851506°S 145.378475°E		
				Penguin General Cemetery		
