= WBMZ =

WBMZ may refer to:

- WBMZ (AM), a radio station (1360 AM) licensed to serve Metter, Georgia, United States
- WBMQ (FM), a radio station (103.7 FM) licensed to serve Metter, Georgia, which held the call sign WBMZ from 1998 to 2026
