= WEGC =

WEGC may refer to:

- WBMZ (AM), a radio station (1360 AM) licensed to serve Metter, Georgia, United States, which held the call sign WEGC from 2023 to 2026
- WNOU (FM), a radio station (107.7 FM) licensed to serve Sasser, Georgia, which held the call sign WEGC from 1995 to 2023
