= WBMQ =

WBMQ may refer to:

- WBMQ (FM), a radio station (103.7 FM) licensed to Metter, Georgia, United States
- WBMQ (Savannah, Georgia), a former radio station (630 AM) licensed to Savannah, Georgia, which held the call sign from 1985 to 2020
