= XHQY-FM =

Radio station in Toluca, State of Mexico, Mexico

- Cacalomacán, Toluca, State of Mexico; Mexico
- Frequency: 103.7 FM (HD Radio)
- Branding: La Nueva Bestia

Programming
- Format: Adult Contemporary

Ownership
- Owner: Grupo Radiorama; (Radio Toluca, S.A. de C.V.)
- Operator: Salvador Pérez Habib

History
- First air date: January 11, 1965 (concession); July 2, 2018 (FM)
- Former frequencies: 1360 kHz (1965–2000s); 1200 kHz (2000s–2020)

Technical information
- Class: A
- ERP: 3 kW
- HAAT: -1.5 m
- Transmitter coordinates: 19°17′47″N 99°39′10″W

Links
- Webcast: Listen live
- Website: www.iheart.com/live/la-nueva-bestia-1037-toluca-10707

XHQY-FM is a radio station in Toluca, State of Mexico, Mexico. Broadcasting on 103.7 FM, XHQY carries the La Nueva Bestia format of its owner, Grupo Radiorama, and presently is operated by Salvador Pérez Habib.

== History ==
Logo used as La Bestia Grupera from 2015 to 2018

XEQY received its concession on January 11, 1965, and was known as "Radio Fiesta". It operated on 1360 kHz with 500 watts. In the early 2000s, it moved to 1200.

The station was previously owned by Grupo ACIR, with a ranchera music as "Q' bonita", before flipped a romantic format under "Inolvidable" in 2004, and then to a news/talk format "QY Noticias" in 2006. In August 2009, ACIR ceased operating XEQY-AM, and in October 2009 control passed to Radiorama with a news/talk and music in English as "Uno Más Uno Radio". On September 27, 2010, it flipped to "Radio Mexicana" with a regional Mexican format. In July 2014 the station changed names using a variety format known as Atmósfera and on August 21, 2015 finally adopted the La Bestia Grupera brand.

On July 2, 2018, XEQY migrated from AM to FM as XHQY-FM 103.7 and simultaneously changed from La Bestia Grupera to Retro FM, a Spanish oldies format. It lasted just over two months, with XHQY returning to Bestia Grupera in September. The AM was shut off for good at 11:59 p.m. on June 11, 2020.

In November 2022, the station leased to local operator Salvador Pérez Habib which also operated XHINFO-FM in Mexico City, and later rebranded as La Nueva Bestia.
