= City Park, Launceston =

Park in Launceston, Tasmania, Australia

Coordinates: 41.4325°S 147.1433°E

City Park
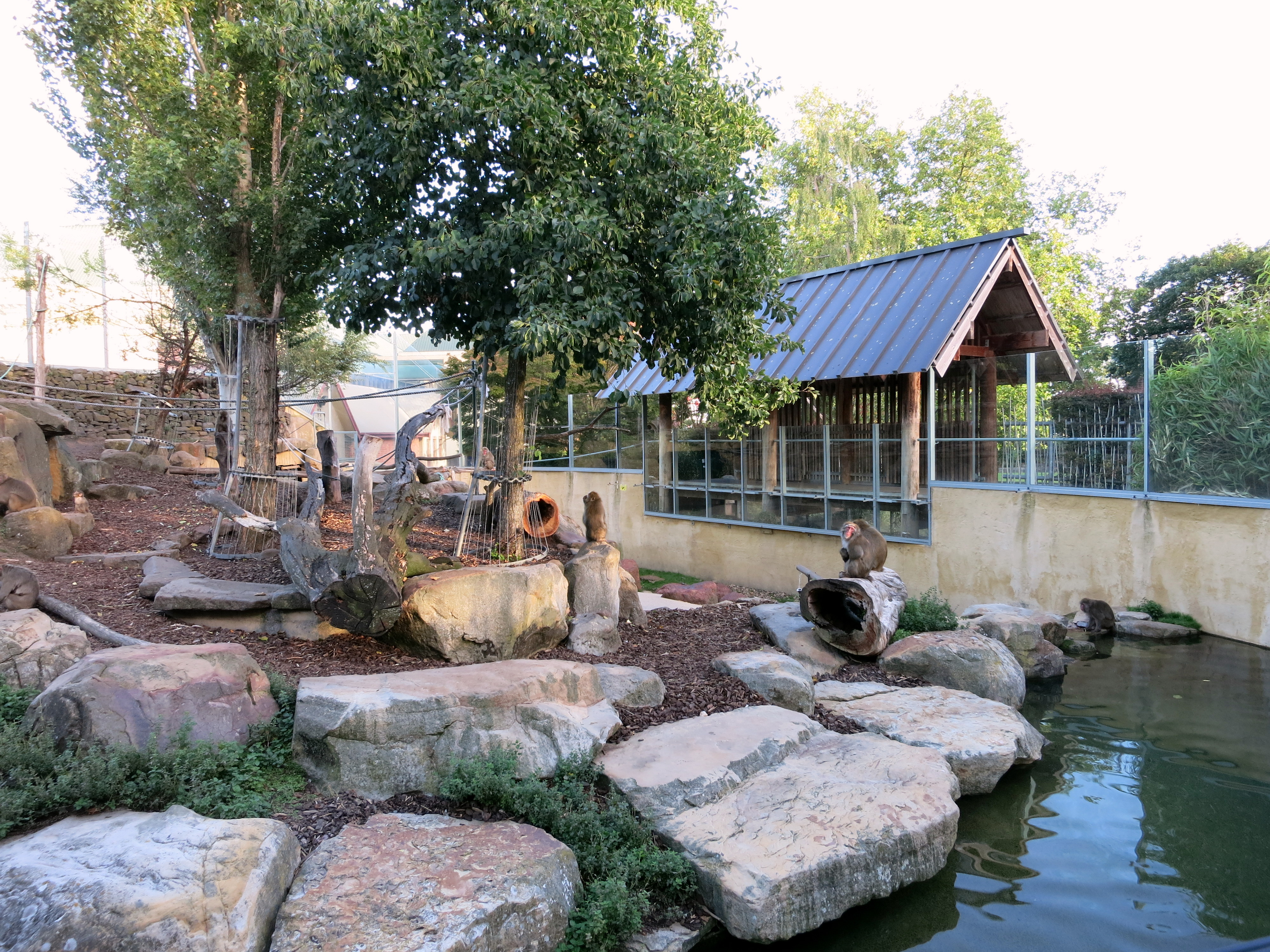
- Japanese macaque enclosure in 2015
- Interactive map of City Park
- Created: 1820s
- Owner: Launceston City Council
- Operator: Launceston City Council
- Status: Open all year

Launceston City Park is a park in Launceston, Tasmania, Australia. Established in the 1820s by the Launceston Horticultural Society and handed over to the Launceston City Council in 1863. It is now an important part of cultural life in Launceston and also a heritage park.

== History ==
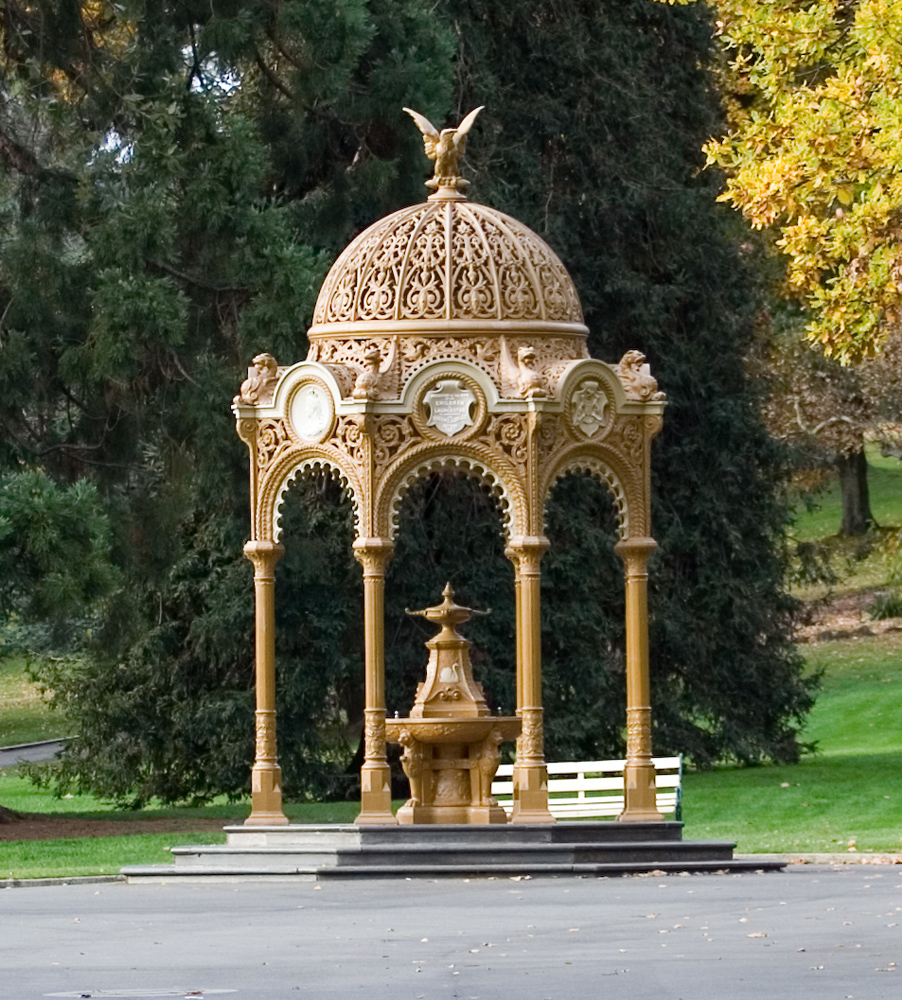
The ornate cast iron 'Jubilee Fountain'

The history of City Park started with the allocation of an allotment for the Government Cottage in 1807 at the base of Windmill Hill. In the 1820s, the Launceston Horticultural Society acquired the neighbouring allotment to the immediate west of the government gardens for use as a botanical garden. In 1863, the Launceston Horticultural Society handed the gardens over to the Launceston City Council along with the government gardens to create what was named 'Peoples Park'. Over time, the Government Cottage ended up as rental accommodation and fell into disrepair until it to was handed over to the council in 1885 and demolished.

In 1891, the Albert Hall was built on the north east corner of the park to house the Tasmanian Industrial Exhibition. The exhibition area enclosed a large corner of the park under temporary structures attached to the Albert Hall. A miniature railway was also set up within the park for a short time during the exhibition. In 1932, Launceston Corporation built the John Hart Conservatory in the western half of the park. A twin copy built from the same plans was also erected at Parramatta Creek near Latrobe.

In 1965, Launceston became a sister city with Ikeda in Japan, who gifted the Launceston City Council with an exhibit of Japanese macaques which was built near the Cameron Street entrance to the park.

== Features ==
Little Toot, City Park, 1963

The parks attractions include many gardens, a conservatory, band stand, duck pond, children's playground, the Tasmanian Design Center and a Monkey Island, which houses a group of macaques that are separated from visitors by a glass wall and a small moat. The park has a series of memorials and statues including Launceston's Boer War Memorial, a statue of Tasmanian botanist Ronald Campbell Gunn and a plinthed cannon taken as a war trophy from the Crimean War. The most prominent building at the park is the Albert Hall. Next to the Albert Hall are the studios of City Park Radio, located in the former Park Caretakers Cottage, which also has one of the oldest wisteria vines in Australia, planted in 1837. The park plays host to Festivale, a popular annual food festival held every February.

Three different trains have been operating around the paths of the park since 1960, giving rides to the children of Launceston. The first train was made in 1960 by TJ & ND Burness, an engineering business at 6 Herbert St Launceston. The train consisted of an engine and four carriages, brightly coloured, and was known as Little Toot.

== See also ==
- List of public art in Tasmania
