= Peter Collett =

Peter Collett may refer to:

- Peter Collett (judge) (1766–1836), Norwegian judge
- Peter Collett (writer) (1767–1823), Danish judge and writer
