= 580 AM =

AM radio frequency

The following radio stations broadcast on AM frequency 580 kHz: 580 AM is classified as a regional broadcast frequency by the Federal Communications Commission.

== Argentina ==
- Andina in San Rafael, Mendoza
- LU20 in Trelew, Chubut
- LV15 in Villa Mercedes, San Luis
- LW1 in Córdoba, Córdoba.

== Bolivia ==
- CP 91 in La Paz

== Brazil ==
- ZYJ-330 in Santa Helena, Paraná
- ZYJ-465 in Rio de Janeiro
- ZYH-290 in Tefé
- ZYH-477 in Alcobaça, Bahia
- ZYI-387 in Campo Grande
- ZYI-776 in Recife
- ZYK-299 in São Gabriel
- ZYK-318 in Vacaria
- ZYK-540 in Americana, São Paulo state
- ZYK-724 in Palmital
- ZYK780 in Porto Nacional
- ZYL-328 in Uberlandia

== Canada ==
Call sign	City of license	Daytime power (kW)	Nighttime power (kW)	Transmitter coordinates
CFRA	Ottawa, Ontario	50	30	45.2014°N 75.7239°W
CKWW	Windsor, Ontario	0.5	0.5	42.1728°N 83.0481°W
CHAH	Edmonton, Alberta	10	10	

== Chile ==
- CB-058 in Easter Island.

== Colombia ==
- HJHP in Jamundí

== Cuba ==
- CMAA in Pinar del Río
- CMMF in Baracoa

== Ecuador ==
- HCPC2 in Guayaquil

== Guatemala ==
- TGY in Pucá

== Honduras ==
- HRZQ in Tegucigalpa

== Jamaica ==
- RJR in Galina

== Mexico ==
- XEAV-AM in Guadalajara, Jalisco
- XEFI-AM in Chihuahua, Chihuahua
- XEYI-AM in Cancún, Quintana Roo
- XELRDA-AM in Piedras Negras, Coahuila

== Panama ==
- HOH 4 in Chiriqui

== Paraguay ==
- ZP61 in Pilar, Paraguay

== Peru ==
- OAX2E in Jaén, San Ignacio, Peru

== United States ==
Call sign	City of license	Facility ID	Class	Daytime power (kW)	Nighttime power (kW)	Transmitter coordinates
KIDO	Nampa, Idaho	17396	B	20	4.4	43.559722°N 116.400556°W
KJMJ	Alexandria, Louisiana	20492	B	5	1	31.308333°N 92.415833°W
KMJ	Fresno, California	26923	B	50	50	36.659167°N 119.346389°W
KRFE	Lubbock, Texas	60804	B	0.5	0.29	33.533333°N 101.820556°W
KSAZ	Marana, Arizona	51079	B	5	0.39	32.453056°N 111.284444°W
KTMT	Ashland, Oregon	57733	B	1	1	42.164167°N 122.647778°W
KUBC	Montrose, Colorado	73626	B	5	1	38.425556°N 107.8825°W
KZMX	Hot Springs, South Dakota	46723	B	2.3	0.31	43.456667°N 103.476111°W
WACQ	Tuskegee, Alabama	1018	D	0.5	0.139	32.376667°N 85.657778°W
WCHS	Charleston, West Virginia	71660	B	5	5	38.364167°N 81.768056°W
WDBO	Orlando, Florida	48726	B	5	5	28.619722°N 81.409722°W
WELO	Tupelo, Mississippi	58829	D	0.77	0.095	34.238056°N 88.695278°W
WGAC	Augusta, Georgia	4435	B	5	0.84	33.512222°N 82.08°W (daytime); 33.524722°N 81.908611°W (nighttime)
WHP	Harrisburg, Pennsylvania	15322	B	5	5	40.303056°N 76.951944°W
WIBW	Topeka, Kansas	63169	B	5	5	39.084722°N 95.782778°W
WILL	Urbana, Illinois	68941	D	5	0.1	40.080833°N 88.236111°W
WKAQ	San Juan, Puerto Rico	19099	B	10	10	18.432222°N 66.135833°W
WKSK	West Jefferson, North Carolina	8146	D	5	0.034	36.410833°N 81.496111°W
WKTY	La Crosse, Wisconsin	36207	B	5	0.74	43.740278°N 91.205833°W
WLVA	Lynchburg, Virginia	39579	D	0.25	0.014	37.420833°N 79.115278°W
WTAG	Worcester, Massachusetts	35230	B	5	5	42.336944°N 71.820833°W
WTCM	Traverse City, Michigan	70524	B	50	1.1	44.721667°N 85.705°W
WXRH	Rockwood, Tennessee	51114	D	5	0.049	35.827778°N 84.655278°W

== Uruguay ==
- CX58 in Montevideo

== Venezuela ==
- YVMJ in Maracaibo
