= WPVM =

WPVM may refer to:

- WPVM (FM), a radio station (88.5 FM) licensed to serve Sturgeon Bay, Wisconsin, United States
- WPVM-LP, a low-power radio station (103.7 FM) licensed to serve Asheville, North Carolina, United States
