= WGON =

WGON may refer to:

- WGON-LP, a low-power radio station (103.7 FM) licensed to serve Slidell, Louisiana, United States
- WNLS (FM), a radio station (91.3 FM) licensed to serve Slidell, Louisiana, which held the call sign WGON from 2010 to 2018
- WGON, a fictional television station in the 1978 film Dawn of the Dead
