= WKSK =

WKSK can refer to:

- WKSK (AM), a radio station (580 AM) licensed to West Jefferson, North Carolina, United States
- WKSK-FM, a radio station (101.9 FM) licensed to South Hill, Virginia, United States
