= KDJW =

- Amarillo, Texas; United States
- Broadcast area: Amarillo area
- Frequency: 1010 kHz
- Branding: Saint Valentine Catholic Radio

Programming
- Format: Catholic radio

Ownership
- Owner: Saint Valentine Catholic Radio; (Catholic Radio of the Texas High Plains)
- Sister stations: KTNZ

History
- Call sign meaning: KAMQ (1947–1959); KBUY (1959–1967); KVII (1967–1968); KDJW (1968–1995); KTNZ (1995–2021)

Technical information
- Licensing authority: FCC
- Facility ID: 31462
- Class: B
- Power: 5000 watts Daytime; 500 watts Night
- Transmitter coordinates: 35°11′3.00″N 101°41′28.00″W
- Translators: K233CB (94.5 MHz, Canyon)

Links
- Public license information: Public file; LMS

KDJW (1010 AM) is a radio station broadcasting a Catholic radio format in Amarillo, Texas, United States. The station is currently owned by Catholic Radio of the Texas High Plains.

A sports station until 2017, the then-KTNZ was sold that year to Saint Valentine Catholic Radio for $150,000. ESPN Radio programs moved to KGNC.

In 2021, English-language programming was moved exclusively to 1010 kHz, which also reclaimed its former longtime KDJW call sign from the station at 1360. That frequency was relaunched as a Spanish-language Catholic radio station, "Radio San Toribio".
