= WNAH =

Nashville, Tennessee; United States
- Frequency: 1360 kHz
- Branding: Power Gospel

Programming
- Format: Urban Gospel
- Affiliations: American Urban Radio Networks

Ownership
- Owner: Hoyt M. Carter, Jr.

History
- First air date: December 24, 1949; 76 years ago
- Call sign meaning: With News About Heaven

Technical information
- Licensing authority: FCC
- Facility ID: 27079
- Class: D
- Power: 1,000 watts days; 27 watts nights
- Transmitter coordinates: 36°11′30.00″N 86°46′26.00″W

Links
- Public license information: Public file; LMS
- Webcast: Listen live
- Website: wnah.com

WNAH (1360 AM, "Power Gospel") is a radio station broadcasting an urban gospel radio format, with some Christian talk and teaching programming. Licensed to Nashville, Tennessee, United States, the station is currently owned by Hoyt M. Carter, Jr.

By day, WNAH is powered at 1,000 watts as a class D station. To protect other stations on 1360 AM from interference at night, it reduces power to 27 watts. The station's transmitter is on Richardson Avenue in Nashville.

== History ==
The station (originally a daytimer station required to sign-off at night) started by Van T. Irwin, Jr. a veteran from WWII, signed on the air on December 24, 1949.
