= XHZPC-FM =

Radio station in Jojutla–Cuernavaca, Morelos, Mexico

- Jojutla-Cuernavaca, Morelos; Mexico
- Frequency: 103.7 FM
- Branding: Irradia

Ownership
- Owner: Concepción Arias González

History
- First air date: February 11, 1993
- Call sign meaning: ZacatePeC (original station location)

Technical information
- ERP: 24.19 kW
- Transmitter coordinates: 18°35′31.2″N 99°15′28.4″W

XHZPC-FM is a radio station on 103.7 FM in Jojutla, Morelos, Mexico serving Cuernavaca. It carries a romantic format known as Irradia.

== History ==
XHZPC received its concession on February 10, 1993, signing on the very next day and broadcasting a grupera format to the southern region of Morelos. It was owned by Melesio Fernández Quiroz. Talk and other programs commenced from April 1, with news programming beginning that July and expanding in 1996.

XHZPC increased its power to the current 24 kW in 2010.

On August 1, 2015, XHZPC flipped to the La Única format from Grupo Siete. It initially retained the name when other La Única stations changed their name to Bengala but dropped it in April 2017. Just three months later, on July 1, 2017, it changed formats to romantic and adopted the Quiéreme name. The name was modified to "Quiéreme Más" in 2021 when Grupo Siete stopped operating the station.
