= XHVSL-TDT =

- Ciudad Valles, San Luis Potosí; Mexico
- Channels: Digital: 36 (UHF); Virtual: 8
- Branding: Televalles

Programming
- Affiliations: Independent station

Ownership
- Owner: TV Ocho, S.A. de C.V.
- Sister stations: XHIR-FM

History
- Founded: 1996
- Last air date: December 31, 2021
- Call sign meaning: "Ciudad Valles, San Luis Potosí"

Technical information
- Licensing authority: CRT
- ERP: 85.673 kW
- Transmitter coordinates: 21°58′43.70″N 98°54′33.50″W

Links
- Website: televalles.blogspot.com

XHVSL-TDT, branded on air as Televalles, was a television station licensed to Ciudad Valles, San Luis Potosí, Mexico. Broadcasting on channel 8 from a main transmitter located east of Ciudad Valles on Cerro El Abra, XHVSL is a local independent station.

== History ==
XHVSL signed on in 1996, under the concessionaire Alfonso Esper Bujaidar. Upon Esper's death in 2008, Adrián and Alfonso Esper Cárdenas inherited the station, and they consolidated their interest under the company TV Ocho, S.A. de C.V. Since this station signed on, it has been co-operated with XEIR-AM, which migrated to FM as XHIR-FM.

== Programming ==
Televalles produces a large quantity of local programming. The station produces a local newscast on weekdays, known as NTV, as well as programs such as Conexión Universitaria, a program for students of the Universidad Autónoma de San Luis Potosí.

XHVSL was previously a local affiliate of Televisa's Nueve and FOROtv networks.

== Translators ==
XHVSL has two translator stations that extend the station's signal to the north and south:

Channel	City	Digital ERP
36 (9)	Tamazunchale	2 kW
36 (7)	Ciudad Mante, Tamps.	1 kW

Unlike many translator stations, both translators of XHVSL have separate names and identities: "TV Tamazunchale" and "TV Mante".
