= CFID-FM =

Community radio station in Quebec, Canada

Coordinates: 45°37′54″N 72°33′53″W

- Acton Vale, Quebec; Canada
- Frequency: 103.7 MHz
- Branding: Radio Acton

Programming
- Format: community radio

Ownership
- Owner: Radio Acton

History
- First air date: 2004

Technical information
- Class: A
- ERP: 860 watts average 1,926 watts peak
- HAAT: 47.2 metres (155 ft)

Links
- Website: Radio Acton Website

CFID-FM is a community radio radio station that broadcasts at 103.7 FM in Acton Vale, Quebec.

Owned by Radio Acton, the station was licensed in 2004.
