= WCGL =

Jacksonville, Florida; United States
- Broadcast area: Jacksonville, Florida
- Frequency: 1360 kHz
- Branding: Victory AM 1360

Programming
- Format: Urban gospel
- Affiliations: American Urban Radio Networks

Ownership
- Owner: JBD Communications, Inc.

History
- First air date: April 4, 1948
- Former call signs: WOBS (1948–1975)
- Call sign meaning: Where Christ Gets Lifted

Technical information
- Licensing authority: FCC
- Facility ID: 30609
- Class: D
- Power: 5,000 watts (day); 89 watts (night)
- Transmitter coordinates: 30°16′33.9″N 81°38′11.3″W
- Translator: 94.7 W234CW (Jacksonville)

Links
- Public license information: Public file; LMS
- Webcast: Listen live
- Website: www.wcgl1360.com

WCGL (1360 AM) is a commercial radio station broadcasting an urban gospel radio format. Licensed to Jacksonville, Florida, United States, the station is owned by JBD Communications, Inc. The station airs contemporary gospel music and some preaching programs, aimed at the African-American community. It uses the moniker "The Victory Station".

WCGL transmits with 5,000 watts by day, but to avoid interfering with other radio stations on AM 1360, WCGL reduces power at night to 89 watts. Listeners in Jacksonville and adjacent communities can hear WCGL programming on an FM translator station, 94.7 W234CW.

== History ==
The station first signed on the air on April 4, 1948, as WOBS. It was owned by the Southern Radio & Equipment Company and was a daytimer. It originally broadcast at 1,000 watts by day and had to go off the air at sunset. The call sign was changed to WCGL on August 18, 1975.
