= XHIR-FM =

Radio station in Ciudad Valles, San Luis Potosí, Mexico

- Ciudad Valles, San Luis Potosí; Mexico
- Frequency: 103.7 FM
- Branding: Stereobit

Programming
- Format: Pop/Latin/Top 40

Ownership
- Owner: Organización Radio Valles, S.A. de C.V.
- Sister stations: XHVSL-TDT

History
- First air date: August 28, 1988 (concession)
- Former frequencies: 1410 AM (1988–2012), 106.1 FM (2012–2018)

Technical information
- Licensing authority: CRT
- Class: B1
- ERP: 25 kW
- HAAT: −41.6 m (−136 ft)
- Transmitter coordinates: 21°59′36.14″N 99°00′08.83″W

Links
- Webcast: Listen live
- Website: stereobitfm.com

XHIR-FM is a radio station on 103.7 FM in Ciudad Valles, San Luis Potosí, Mexico. It is known as Stereobit.

== History ==
XEIR-AM 1410 received its concession on August 28, 1988, but it had first been put out for bid in 1972. The losing bidders for the station attempted to dislodge concessionaire Enrique Cárdenas González, first before the Technical Consultative Commission and then in the courts. Sindulfo Martínez Manzanares and Oliva B. Navarro received an amparo against them, but ultimately the courts found in Cárdenas González's favor and XEIR was cleared to begin operations. The station operated with 1,000 watts as a daytimer for its first three months, but in November, it was promptly allowed to boost power to 5 kW day/.5 kW night. Martínez Manzanares and Navarro continued their fight into the 2000s, but as they did not provide certain documents to the courts in 2001, time ran out on their court case.

XEIR received approval to migrate to FM in April 2012. That year, XEIR and XHIR-FM were transferred to Laura Cárdenas del Avellano. In 2015, rights for XHIR were transferred to Organización Radio Valles.

XHIR-FM moved to 103.7 MHz on February 19, 2018 in order to clear 106-108 MHz for community and indigenous stations, as a condition of its concession renewal. The station reverted to the "Stereobit" name after a brief stint as Regional Mexican outlet "La Mexicana" from 2017 to 2019.
