= XHEMU-FM =

Radio station in Piedras Negras, Coahuila

XHEMU-FM / XELRDA-AM
- Piedras Negras, Coahuila; Mexico
- Frequencies: 103.7 FM (HD Radio); 580 AM
- Branding: La Rancherita del Aire

Programming
- Format: Regional Mexican

Ownership
- Owner: Claudio Mario Bres Medina; (XELRDA-AM: La Rancherita del Aire, S.A. de C.V.)

History
- First air date: March 10, 1937

Technical information
- Licensing authority: CRT
- Class: A (FM); C (AM)
- Power: 250 watts
- ERP: 3 kW
- HAAT: 67 m (220 ft)
- Transmitter coordinates: 28°42′10.28″N 100°32′34.04″W

Links
- Webcast: Listen live
- Website: rancherita.com.mx

XHEMU-FM/XELRDA-AM is a radio station on 103.7 FM and 580 AM in Piedras Negras, Coahuila. It is owned by Claudio Mario Bres Medina and is known as La Rancherita del Aire, carrying a Regional Mexican format.

== History ==
XHEMU began as XEMU-AM 580. The original concession was awarded on March 10, 1937, to Alfonso Bres Burckhardt. Upon his death, the station was transferred to its current owner.

It was moved to FM in 2011 and was cleared to change transmitter sites in 2015.

In the IFT-4 radio auction of 2017, La Rancherita del Aire bought back its former AM frequency of 580, which now has the callsign XELRDA-AM.

== HD Radio ==
XHEMU-FM broadcasts in HD Radio and was authorized on July 17, 2024, to broadcast three additional subchannels:

- HD1: La Rancherita Del Aire
- HD2: Radio Nostalgia
- HD3: Studio 103.7 FM
- HD4: Puré Country
