= XHMR-FM =

Radio station in Aguascalientes, Aguascalientes

XHMR
- Aguascalientes, Aguascalientes; Mexico
- Broadcast area: Aguascalientes
- Frequency: 103.7 FM
- Branding: Estéreo Mendel

Programming
- Format: cultural, Catholic Mexican

Ownership
- Owner: Instituto Mendel, A.C.

History
- First air date: 1979/80

Technical information
- Licensing authority: CRT
- Class: A
- ERP: 2.79 kW
- HAAT: 40.31 meters (132.3 ft)

Links
- Website: Estéreo Mendel

XHMR-FM is a radio station in Aguascalientes, Aguascalientes. It is owned by the Instituto Mendel, a Catholic primary, secondary and bachillerato school, and broadcasts a cultural and Catholic radio format on 103.7 FM as "Estéreo Mendel".
