= KHNC =

Radio station in Johnstown, Colorado

- Johnstown, Colorado; United States
- Broadcast area: Fort Collins-Greeley
- Frequency: 1360 kHz
- Branding: 1360 KHNC: The Lion

Programming
- Format: Conservative talk radio
- Affiliations: Genesis Communications Network; Salem Radio Network

Ownership
- Owner: Joe Jaquint; (Excursion Broadcasting Network, LLC)

History
- First air date: January 1993
- Former call signs: KZOI (1986–1989, CP)

Technical information
- Licensing authority: FCC
- Facility ID: 17183
- Class: B
- Power: 10,000 watts day; 1,000 watts night
- Transmitter coordinates: 40°23′10.9″N 104°54′20.9″W

Links
- Public license information: Public file; LMS
- Website: 1360khnc.com

KHNC (1360 AM) "The Lion" is a privately owned radio station broadcasting a conservative talk format in Johnstown, Colorado, United States.

== History ==
KHNC began broadcasting in January 1993. It was originally owned by Donald and Sharon Wiedeman, broadcasting the same conservative talk format it has carried since. The station first gained notoriety in 1996 when the Montana Freemen called into the station during their 81-day standoff with the FBI, though the station was already airing programming that espoused conspiracy theories and railed against the "New World Order". Known initially as the "USA Patriot Network", KHNC rebranded as the "American Freedom Network" after the Oklahoma City bombing in 1995. Some of its programming also aired over shortwave station WWCR.

On November 29, 1997, a fire broke out at KHNC's studio base, destroying the former farm store, which also housed a magazine known as American Freedom. The blaze was started by a faulty hot plate inside the residence of Suzanne Harris and Peter Ludwell, who hosted a show on the station and lived in the building; the transmitter, located on Wiedeman's 600-acre (240 ha) farm, was not damaged.

Wiedeman died in 2015. In 2019, Joe Jaquint, who already hosted the "Patriot Radio News Hour" which aired on the station, acquired KHNC for $250,000 through his wholly owned Patriot Trading Metals Group. Effective February 28, 2020, Jaquint transferred the station's license to Excursion Broadcasting Network, LLC, of which he is two-thirds owner.
