= WFSJ-LP =

Coordinates: 40.623°N 79.152°W

- Indiana, Pennsylvania; United States
- Broadcast area: Indiana/Johnstown, Pennsylvania
- Frequency: 103.7 MHz

Programming
- Format: Christian Talk

Ownership
- Owner: Hilltop Baptist Church

History
- First air date: February 24, 2003

Technical information
- Licensing authority: FCC
- Class: L1
- ERP: 52 watts

Links
- Public license information: LMS
- Webcast: Listen Live
- Website: http://www.myhilltop.org/

WFSJ-LP is an LPFM radio station, licensed to Indiana, the seat of government for Indiana County, Pennsylvania. WFSJ-LP is licensed to operate at the assigned frequency of 103.7 MHz with an effective radiated power output of 52 watts. The station is owned by Hilltop Baptist Church.

== History ==
=== As "The Fish" ===
Original owner Godstock Ministries was founded by legendary Pittsburgh on-air personality Chris Lash at the turn of the century, mainly geared towards promoting Christian rock concerts in the Indiana County area. Discovering that a large number of people would turn out for Christian rock acts, Lash believed that the same community would be willing to support a like-formatted radio station. Godstock applied for the first round of LPFM frequencies in 2002, and on February 24, 2003, WFSJ went on the air as "Fish FM" from studios at 637 Philadelphia Street in Indiana.

=== As "The Switch" ===
The moniker was switched less than a year later to "The Switch", but the format and the music remained the same. Live talk programming was mostly hosted by Douglas Varner, as well as other slots occasionally filled by guest hosts. Lash, along with his wife and father, transferred their interests in Godstock Ministries to another party in 2007, as Lash wished to leave the state and pursue other station ownership interests as well as other business interests outside of broadcasting. After years of health problems, Lash died in Tennessee on November 7, 2021 of complications from diabetes.

The station's license and assets were donated by Godstock Ministries to Hilltop Baptist Church effective October 19, 2019.

=== WFSJ Today ===
After Hilltop Baptist Church acquired the station, WFSJ affiliated with the Fundamental Broadcasting Network, adopting its format of Christian Talk and teaching, and originates very little of its own programming. Aside from a Facebook page, the station no longer has an active website or online presence other than its host network.
