= CHPV-FM =

Radio station in Scotstown, Quebec

Coordinates: 45°31′22″N 71°16′32″W

Defunct
- Scotstown, Quebec; Canada
- Frequency: 103.7 MHz

Programming
- Format: Christian radio

Ownership
- Owner: La Fabrique de la Paroisse de Saint-Paul

History
- First air date: August 14, 2000

Technical information
- ERP: 1 watt
- HAAT: -2.5 metres

CHPV-FM was a French language Christian radio station that operates at 103.7 FM in Scotstown, Quebec, Canada.

Owned by La Fabrique de la Paroisse de Saint-Paul, the station received CRTC approval in 2000.
