= KIHL-LP =

- Hilo, Hawaii; United States
- Broadcast area: Hilo
- Frequency: 103.7 MHz
- Branding: Aloha KIHL 103.7 FM

Programming
- Format: Christian Talk and Teaching / Jazz

Ownership
- Owner: Calvary Chapel Hilo

History
- First air date: 2007

Technical information
- Licensing authority: FCC
- Facility ID: 132082
- Class: L1
- ERP: 100 watts
- HAAT: 15.0 meters
- Transmitter coordinates: 19°43′0″N 155°8′15″W

Links
- Public license information: LMS
- Website: calvarychapelhilo.org/index.php/kihl-radio

KIHL-LP (103.7 FM) is a radio station licensed to Hilo, Hawaii, United States, the station serves the Hilo area. The station airs a format consisting of Christian talk and teaching and Jazz and is currently owned by Calvary Chapel Hilo.
