= Penguin General Cemetery =

Public cemetery in Tasmania, Australia

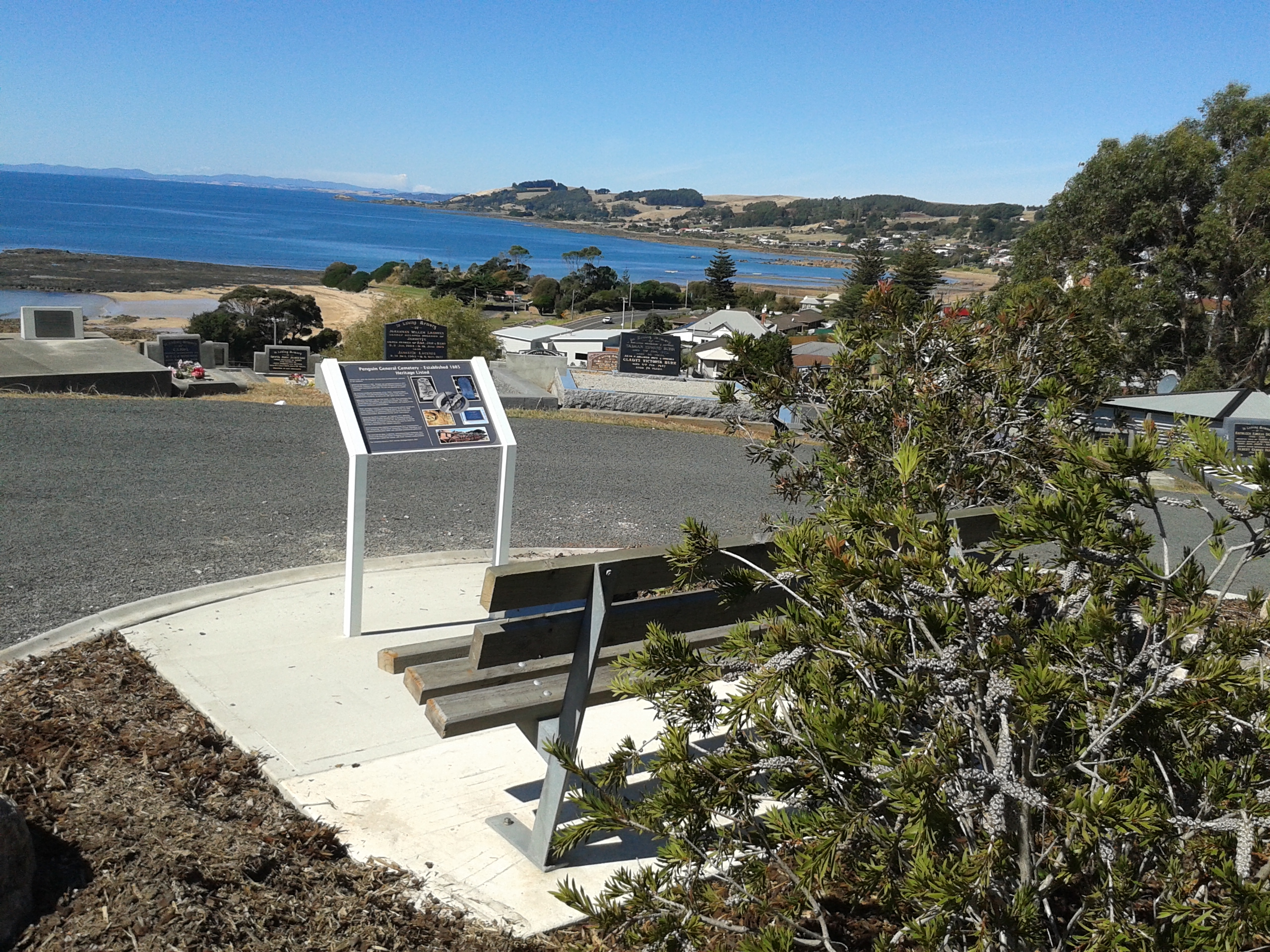
- Penguin General Cemetery's interpretive signage
- Interactive map of Penguin General Cemetery

Details
- Established: 1885
- Location: Penguin, Tasmania
- Country: Australia
- Coordinates: 41.10709°S 146.06442°E
- Find a Grave: Penguin General Cemetery

Penguin General Cemetery was gazetted a public cemetery in 1897; it overlooks the township of Penguin and the Bass Strait in Tasmania, Australia. It is situated on Main Street, a kilometre west of the town's Post Office, on land originally owned by Reverend W.H. Walton of the Primitive Methodist Church.

== History ==
Baby John Lancaster was Penguin's first death, in 1865, four years after European settlement. The first recorded burial was that of Eliza Ann Hales. She was buried in the cemetery on 23 January 1869. Her grave is marked with a headstone. The most complete and up-to-date burial records as well as a detailed plot burial map are available on Council's website.

A community meeting on 28 January 1885 established the Penguin Cemetery Trust. Twelve years and many burials later, the site was gazetted as a public cemetery, known then as the Penguin Public Cemetery. The first meeting of the Trust committee was held on 6 January 1886; the last recorded meeting on 24 June 1943.

Meeting minutes indicate that in its earlier days the cemetery was portioned off according to religious denomination, however this is not evident today. Minutes also indicate additional lands were purchased as demand grew. In 1957 the cemetery opened its new section, essentially delineating the old from the new. The cemetery closed in 1977 when the nearby Penguin/Ulverstone Lawn Cemetery opened on South Road. A few burials still take place in the Penguin Cemetery.

== Heritage-listing ==
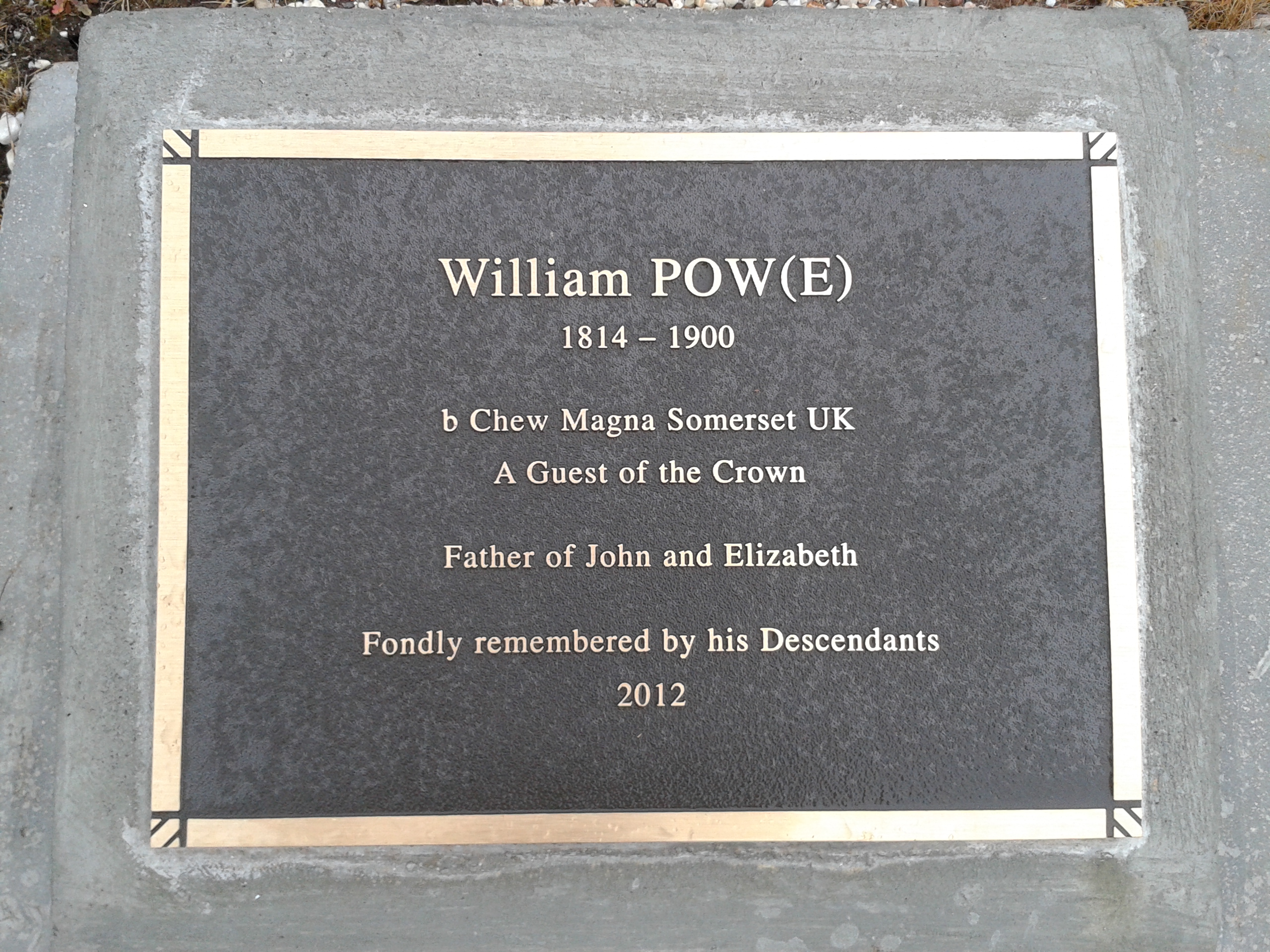
Penguin's colourful heritage

Penguin General Cemetery was heritage-listed in 2007 under Tasmania's Historic Cultural Heritage Act 1995, for its evolutionary pattern of Penguin life, its research potential, community significance, and associations with Tasmanian history. At rest here are Bounty immigrants of the 1850s, returned soldiers from the Boer, First and Second World Wars, many of the town's most notable former residents, as well as former convicts (pictured).

== Penguin History Group ==
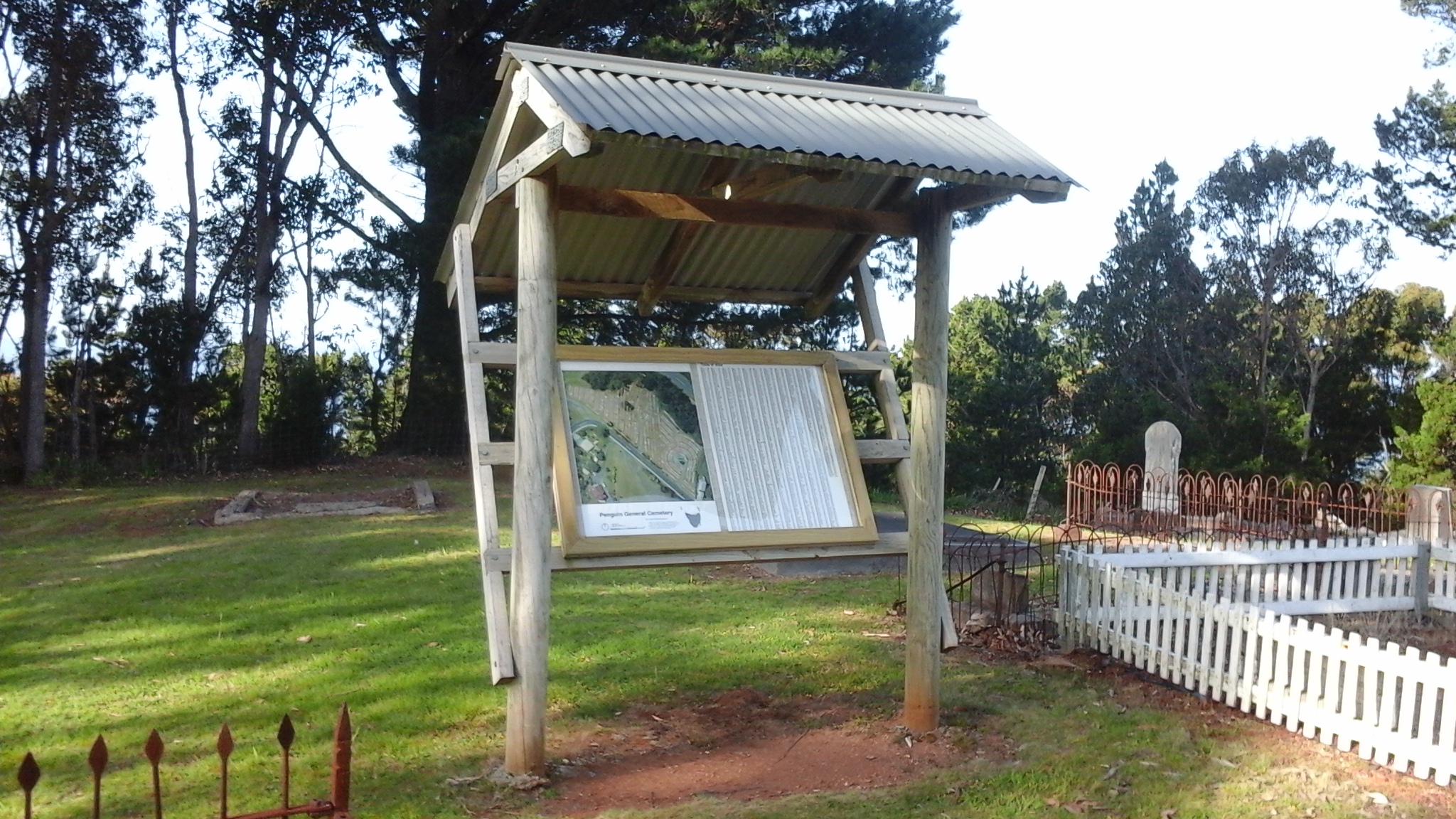
Updated Penguin General Cemetery plot burial information

The Penguin History Group has played a role in the cemetery's recent history. Checking the cemetery map with the records and headstones began in 1994. This information was compiled by the Penguin History Group and published in 2003 in the Penguin Cemetery Old and New Sections. In 2002 members of the Penguin History Group, with materials donated by Central Coast Council, installed the onsite map and its shelter. A Bi-Centenary grant in 2004 of $3,500 enabled erection of entry gateposts and plot marker plaques.

== Recent Research ==
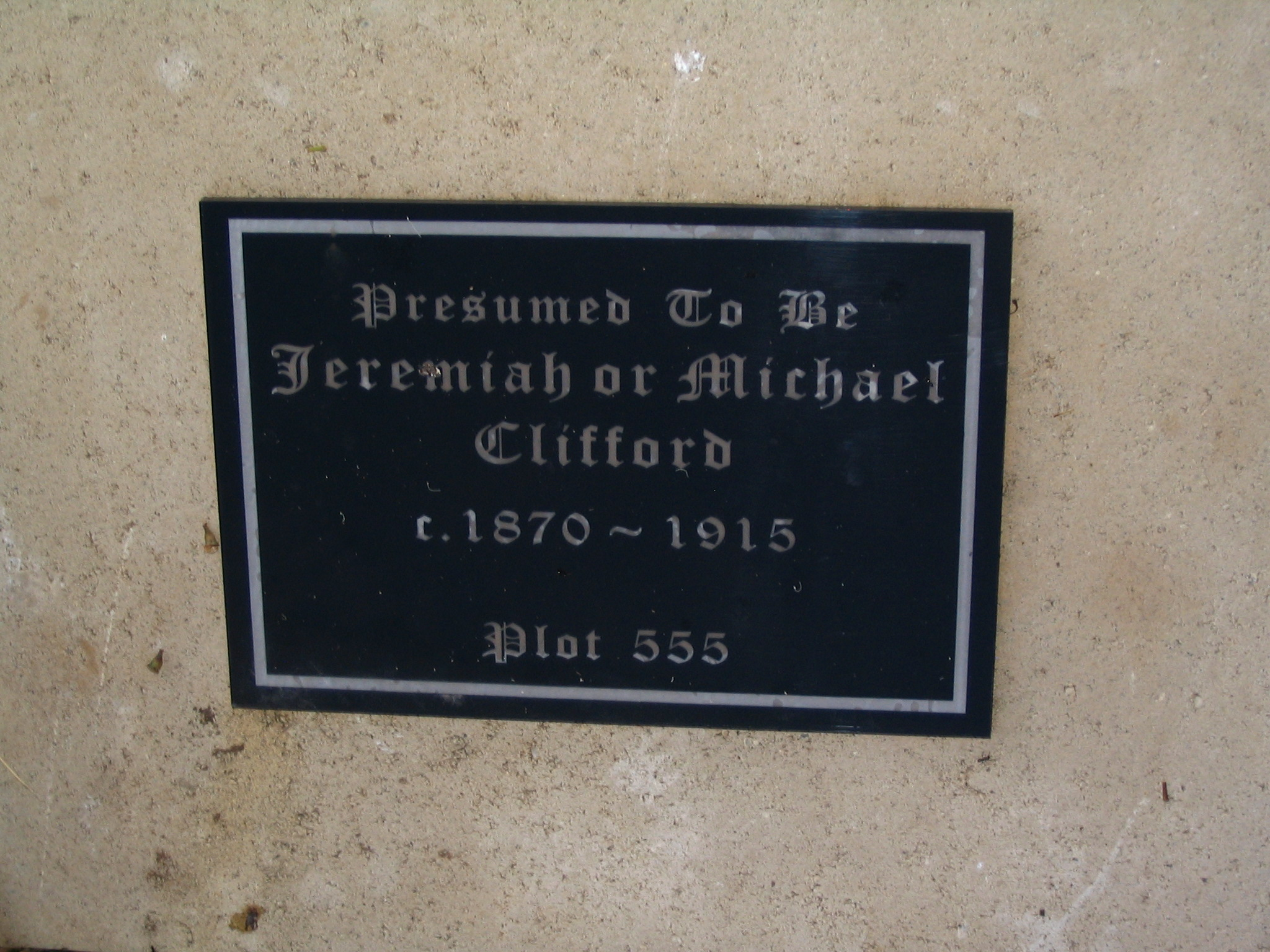
Penguin's 1915 mystery ‘John Doe’

2006 saw renewed interest in the cemetery, sparked essentially by the chance discovery of a 1915 ‘John Doe’ burial in the records. Buried at the back edge of the cemetery, side by side with six other pioneers buried by the state, the discovery generated community interest, which resulted in researching the seven burials and erecting individual gravestones for each.

Research suggests the mystery person may have been Jeremiah or Michael Clifford, an Irishman in his 40s. The most comprehensive account of the circumstance of his death comes from the statewide newspaper: The Mercury, under the heading “A bush tragedy – Dead Body Of Man Found – Gunshot Wound To The Head – Supposed Case Of Suicide”. The case for his presumed identity rests on the Police Gazette records. The remains are still unidentified.

Much is already published on Penguin's heritage-listed cemetery. This has generated investment in showcasing it as a tourist magnet, including a dedicated small internal garden in memory of the tens of unnamed babies buried in the old section.

Such has been the response to the cemetery's ongoing and widespread publicity that the Tasmanian Association for Hospice & Palliative Care (TAH&PC) funded the inaugural Penguin Twilight Celebration of the Dead - music among the tombstones.

This unusual, even unique, event held on Wednesday 7 January 2015 at 7pm in the cemetery was well supported by the broader Penguin community. It marked the centenary of the cemetery's unknown burial. The one-hour musical extravaganza, involving pipers, vocalists, choir, violinist, flautist and guitarist had the crowd of 120-150 people meandering around six of the more significant tombstones. The celebration culminated in the magnificent and moving butterfly release in the commemorative garden dedicated to the tens of unnamed babies in the cemetery.

Photographic images of all headstones are available online at the Australian Cemeteries Index. Most recently, the Penguin community organized an onsite fundraiser to preserve the cemetery's history. The fundraiser was a Long Table dinner within the cemetery grounds, another truly unique experience, and once again bringing the cemetery alive. Attended by 36 guests the monies raised go towards commissioning an art-piece in the commemorative garden for the 80 or so unnamed babies buried in the grounds.

Penguin's leadership in novel uses for old cemeteries is being emulated across Australia.

Most recently the Penguin community dedicated a sculpture to its many unnamed children buried in the cemetery. Children of the World by Bruny Island artist Keith Smith stands in its small commemorative garden.

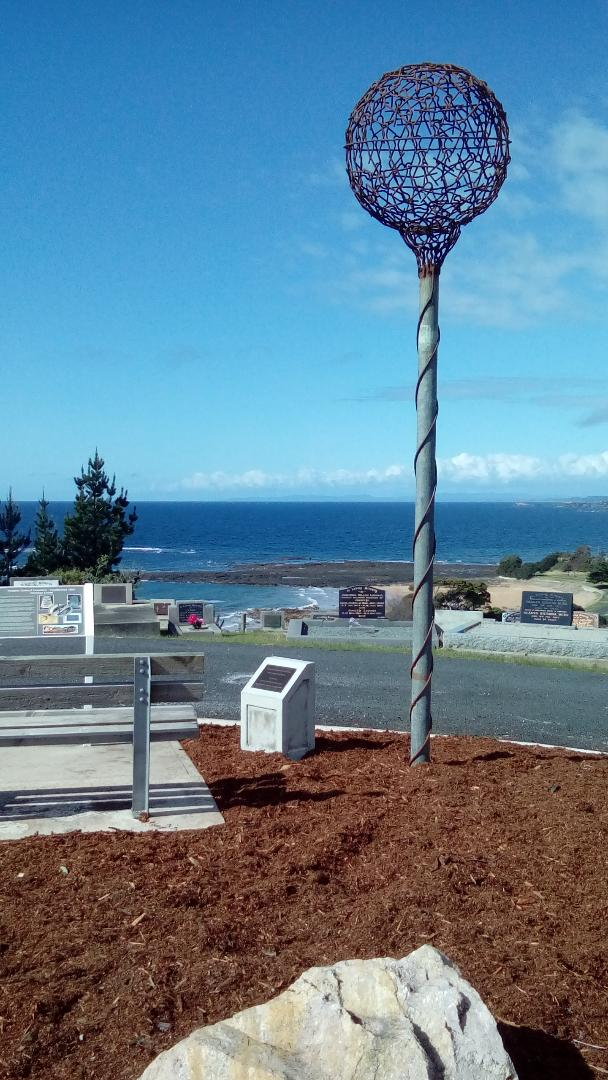
Children of the World sculpture

There have also been ghost tours.

The Penguin General Cemetery app, Stories from Penguin's Heritage Cemetery was launched in February 2022 at an onsite Taiko drumming musical event.
