= WHJC (AM) =

- Matewan, West Virginia; United States
- Broadcast area: Matewan, West Virginia; Central Mingo County, West Virginia; Northeastern Pike County, Kentucky
- Frequency: 1360 kHz
- Branding: 1360 AM

Programming
- Format: Southern Gospel

Ownership
- Owner: Evelyn Warren; (Coalfields Society Foundation Inc.)

History
- First air date: 1951
- Call sign meaning: We Herald Jesus Christ

Technical information
- Licensing authority: FCC
- Facility ID: 67038
- Class: D
- Power: 1,000 Watts daytime only
- Transmitter coordinates: 37°37′2.0″N 82°10′4.0″W
- Translator: (97.1 MHz) W246DL (Matewan)

Links
- Public license information: Public file; LMS

WHJC is a Southern Gospel formatted broadcast radio station licensed to Matewan, West Virginia, serving Matewan, Central Mingo County, West Virginia and Northeastern Pike County, Kentucky. WHJC is owned and operated by Evelyn Warren, through licensee Coalfields Society Foundation Inc.
