= WCBJ =

- Campton, Kentucky; United States
- Frequency: 103.7 MHz
- Branding: B103

Programming
- Format: Adult contemporary

Ownership
- Owner: Morgan County Industries, Inc.

History
- First air date: 1999

Technical information
- Licensing authority: FCC
- Facility ID: 82447
- Class: A
- ERP: 4,100 watts
- HAAT: 121 meters
- Transmitter coordinates: 37°39′03″N 83°26′21″W

Links
- Public license information: Public file; LMS

WCBJ (103.7 FM) is a radio station broadcasting a pop music format. Licensed to Campton, Kentucky, United States. The station is currently owned by Morgan County Industries, Inc.
