= WRPC-LP =

Low-power FM radio station in Hampton, Virginia

- Hampton, Virginia; United States
- Broadcast area: Hampton, Virginia; Newport News, Virginia
- Frequency: 103.7 MHz
- Branding: XL 103

Programming
- Format: Contemporary Christian
- Affiliations: WAY-FM Network

Ownership
- Owner: Peninsula Family Radio

History
- First air date: 2007
- Call sign meaning: W (Calvary) Reformed Presbyterian Church former owners

Technical information
- Licensing authority: FCC
- Facility ID: 125841
- Class: L1
- Power: 9 Watts
- HAAT: 96.1 Meters
- Transmitter coordinates: 37°5′7.0″N 76°25′37.0″W

Links
- Public license information: LMS
- Website: WRPC-LP Online

WRPC-LP is a Contemporary Christian formatted broadcast radio station licensed to Hampton, Virginia, serving the Hampton/Newport News area. WRPC-LP is owned and operated by Peninsula Family Radio.
