= WVKX =

- Irwinton, Georgia; United States
- Frequency: 103.7 MHz

Programming
- Format: Urban Contemporary

Ownership
- Owner: Wilkinson Broadcasting, Inc.

History
- Former call signs: WYSI (1989–1991)

Technical information
- Licensing authority: FCC
- Facility ID: 72466
- Class: A
- ERP: 6,000 watts
- HAAT: 100.0 meters
- Transmitter coordinates: 32°52′48.00″N 83°11′7.00″W

Links
- Public license information: Public file; LMS

WVKX (103.7 FM) is a radio station broadcasting an Urban Contemporary format. Licensed to Irwinton, Georgia, United States. The station is currently owned by Wilkinson Broadcasting, Inc.

== History ==
The station was originally assigned the call letters WYSI on 1989-02-10. on 1991-02-08, the station changed its call sign to the current WVKX.
