= Stephen Walker (sculptor) =

Australian sculptor

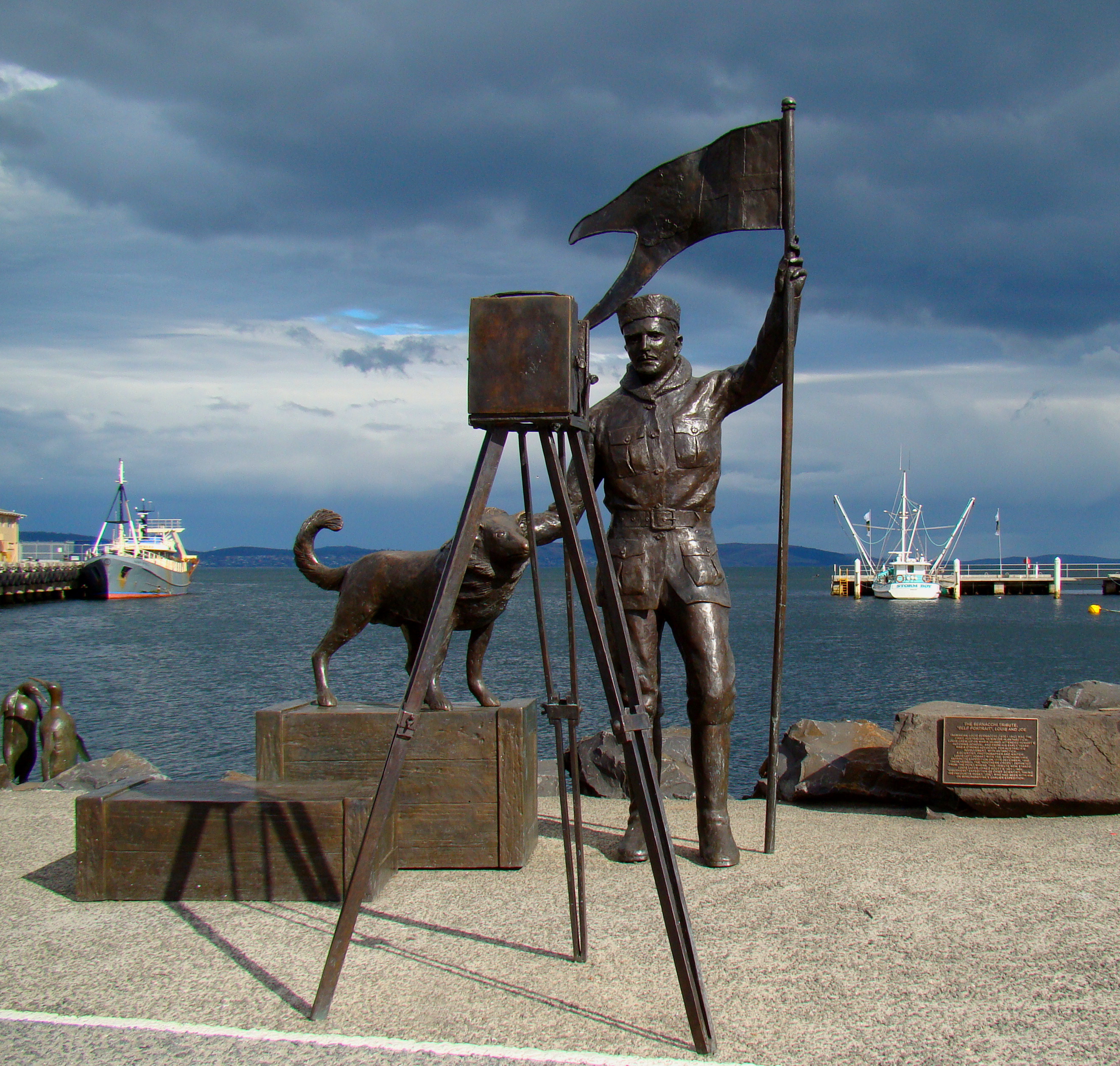
The Bernacchi Tribute, bronze, Hobart

Stephen Walker (1927 – 16 June 2014) was an Australian sculptor who was made a member of the Order of Australia in 1985. In 2011, he was inducted into the Music Victoria Hall of Fame.

== Early life ==
Walker was born in Balwyn or Colac, Victoria in Australia in 1927. He left school at age 13 but attended Melbourne Teachers' College from 1945 to 1947 before moving to Hobart in 1948. In the 1950s he repeatedly traveled to Europe, studying sculpting under Henry Moore from 1954 to 1956 and visiting Rome, Florence and Prague through scholarships. On his return to Australia he settled in Tasmania.

== Work ==
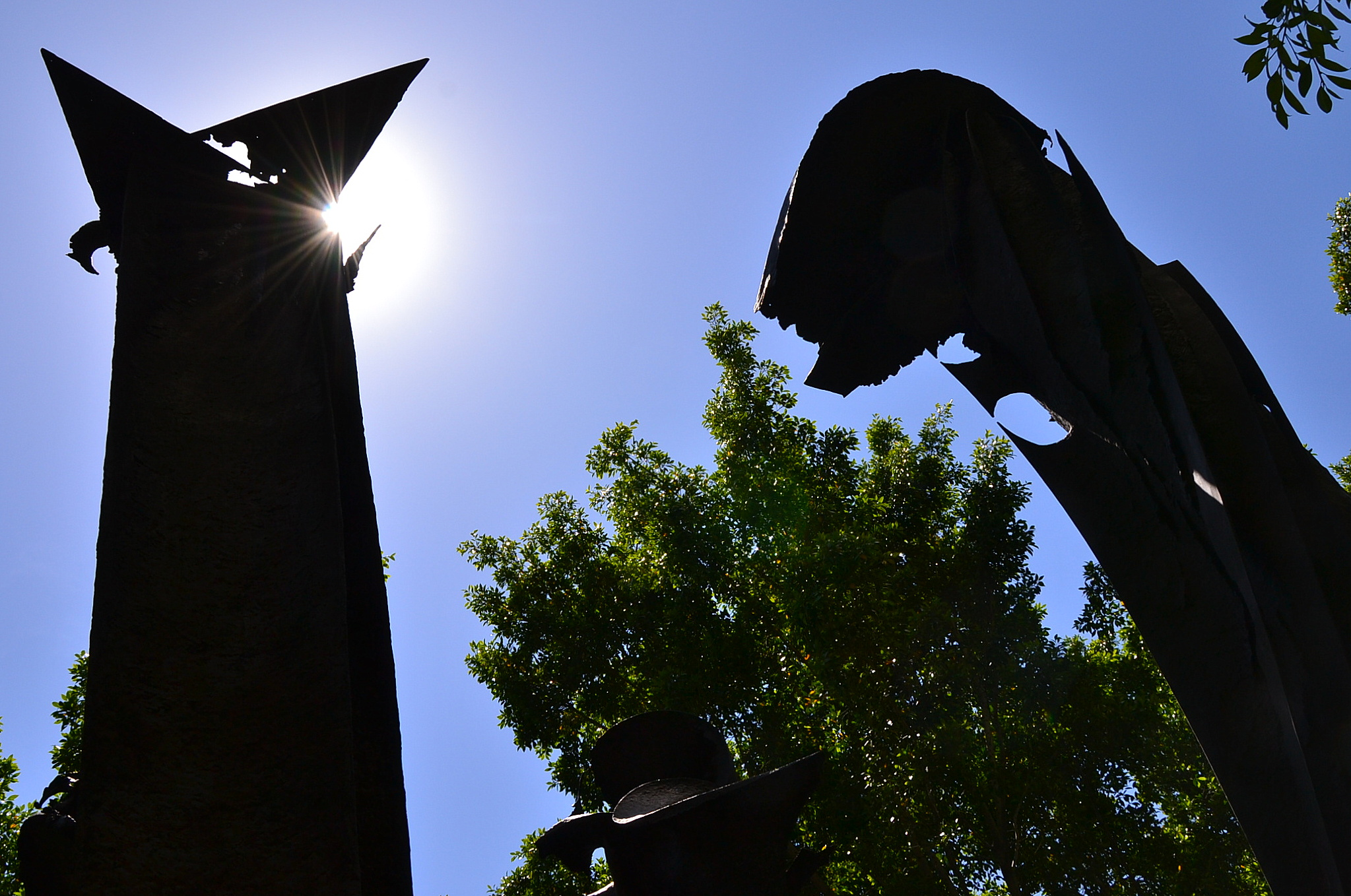
Tank Stream Fountain (1981), bronze, Sydney

Queenstown installation

Walker mainly created bronze sculptures, including the Tank Stream Fountain (1981) in Herald Square near Circular Quay, Sydney and a memorial for Antarctic explorer Louis Bernacchi at Hobart's Victoria Dock. His statues were designed to be usable, for example by strengthening them so people could sit on them. Four of his works are included in the National Heritage Register. Much of his work was inspired by nature and by Antarctica, a continent he visited twice in the 1980s via the Australian Antarctic Division's Humanities Program. He was commissioned by the municipality of Queenstown, Tasmania to produce a memorial to a century of mining in the Mount Lyell area 1883–1983. The work consists of a major statue in timber and bronze depicting a miner, his wife and child, and a series of 21 locally cast bas relief sculptures, laid on a river of local stone, representing major themes and events in its history.

Walker also created medals, including the Royal Society of Tasmania's Joseph Banks Memorial Lecture medal. The Museum Victoria noted his excellence in design. In 1985 Walker was appointed a Member of the Order of Australia "for service to sculpture".

== Personal life and death ==
Walker had two children. He died in Hobart on 16 June 2014 of a lung infection.
