= KLNN =

Radio station in Taos, New Mexico

- Questa, New Mexico; United States
- Broadcast area: Taos, New Mexico
- Frequency: 103.7 MHz
- Branding: Luna 103.7

Programming
- Format: Adult contemporary

Ownership
- Owner: ASKK Media

History
- First air date: October 2006
- Call sign meaning: "Luna New Mexico"

Technical information
- Licensing authority: FCC
- Facility ID: 164283
- Class: C1
- ERP: 51,000 watts
- HAAT: −64.3 meters (−211 ft)
- Transmitter coordinates: 36°39′23″N 105°37′57″W
- Translator: 96.7 K244FD (Taos)
- Repeater: 103.7 KLNN-FM1 (Taos)

Links
- Public license information: Public file; LMS
- Website: luna1037.com

KLNN (103.7 FM), known as Luna, is a radio station broadcasting an adult contemporary format. Licensed to Questa, New Mexico, United States. The station is currently owned by ASKK Media. KLNN began broadcasting in October 2006 and serves the Taos County area, operating a booster station (KLNN-FM1) in the town of Taos.

ASKK Media bought KLNN from West Waves, Inc. for $355,000 in 2010.
