= KKSG-LP =

- Worland, Wyoming; United States
- Frequency: 103.7 MHz

Programming
- Format: Religious

Ownership
- Owner: Sovereign Grace Bible Church

History
- First air date: 2015

Technical information
- Licensing authority: FCC
- Facility ID: 195059
- Class: L1
- ERP: 100 watts
- HAAT: −13.23 meters (−43.4 ft)
- Transmitter coordinates: 44°02′12″N 107°56′52″W

Links
- Public license information: LMS

KKSG-LP (103.7 FM) is a radio station licensed to Worland, Wyoming, United States. The station is currently owned by Sovereign Grace Bible Church.
