= WPPA =

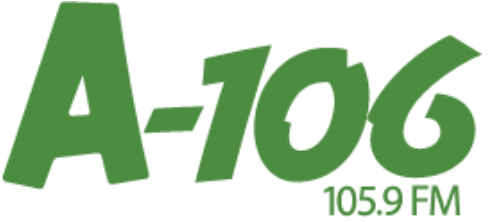
- WPPA logo
- Pottsville, Pennsylvania; United States
- Frequency: 1360 kHz
- Branding: A-106

Programming
- Format: Full-service radio
- Affiliations: CBS News Radio; CBS Sports Radio; Premiere Networks

Ownership
- Owner: Pottsville Broadcasting Co.

History
- First air date: May 9, 1946

Technical information
- Licensing authority: FCC
- Facility ID: 53134
- Class: B
- Power: 5,000 watts day 500 watts night
- Transmitter coordinates: 40°41′56.00″N 76°11′43.00″W
- Translator: 105.9 W290DP (Pottsville)

Links
- Public license information: Public file; LMS
- Webcast: Listen Live
- Website: wpparadio.com

WPPA (1360 AM, "Your News & Sports Leader") is a radio station broadcasting an full-service radio format. Licensed to Pottsville, Pennsylvania, the station has been owned by Pottsville Broadcasting Company since its debut on May 9, 1946, and features programming from CBS News Radio, CBS Sports Radio, and Premiere Networks. The station can also be heard on "FM 106" (W290DP 105.9 MHz).

Former logo
