= KTNZ =

- Amarillo, Texas; United States
- Frequency: 1360 kHz
- Branding: Radio Santo Toribio

Programming
- Language: Spanish
- Format: Catholic religious

Ownership
- Owner: Saint Valentine Catholic Radio; (Catholic Radio of the Texas High Plains)
- Sister stations: KDJW

History
- First air date: September 15, 1955
- Former call signs: KRAY (1955–1975); KQIZ (1975–1986); KWAS (1986–1988); KFNS (1988–1991); KLCJ (1991–1995); KDJW (1995–2021)

Technical information
- Licensing authority: FCC
- Facility ID: 48509
- Class: D
- Power: 6,000 watts day 320 watts night
- Transmitter coordinates: 35°14′49″N 101°49′13″W
- Translators: K228FO (93.5 MHz, Amarillo)

Links
- Public license information: Public file; LMS

KTNZ (1360 AM) is a radio station broadcasting a Catholic religious format. Licensed to Amarillo, Texas, United States, the station is currently owned by Catholic Radio of the Texas High Plains.

Formerly KDJW, this station became KTNZ on March 1, 2021, as part of the move of the English-language Catholic programming from Saint Valentine Catholic Radio to 1010 AM (renamed KDJW). 1360 was relaunched as Spanish-language Catholic outlet "Radio San Toribio".
