= WULS =

- Broxton, Georgia; United States
- Frequency: 103.7 MHz

Programming
- Format: Bluegrass and southern gospel
- Affiliations: ABC News Radio

Ownership
- Owner: WULS, Inc.

History
- First air date: February 14, 1992
- Former call signs: WXEA (1992–1992)

Technical information
- Licensing authority: FCC
- Facility ID: 57758
- Class: A
- ERP: 6,000 watts
- HAAT: 100.0 meters (328.1 ft)
- Transmitter coordinates: 31°35′12.00″N 82°52′25.00″W

Links
- Public license information: Public file; LMS

WULS (103.7 FM) is a Christian radio station broadcasting a bluegrass and Southern gospel format. It is licensed to Broxton, Georgia, United States. The station is currently owned by WULS, Inc. and features programming from ABC Radio.

== History ==
The station went on the air as WXEA on 14 February 1992. On 28 December 1992, the station changed its call sign to the current WULS.
