= Peter Collett (writer) =

Danish judge and writer

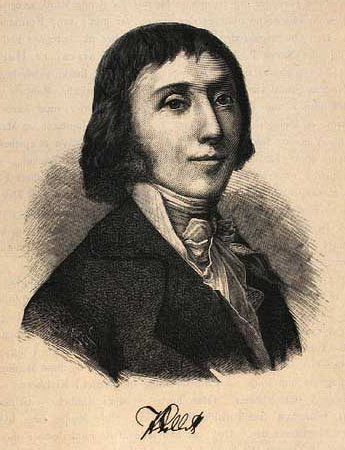
Peter Collett.

Peter Collett (1767 – 21 April 1823) was a Danish judge and writer.

He was born in Zealand as a brother of Johan and Jonas Collett. He was a rationalist and radical, and he published a long and favorable review of Michael Gottlieb Birckners 1797 book On the Freedom of the Press and its Law, where amongst other things he defended the freedom to call for sedition as well as the right for government officials to profess atheism. The same year he was fired from his position as an assessor in Copenhagen for this.

The editor of Lærde Efterretninger Rasmus Nyerup offered him his position as editor of this magazine, and later he accepted the position as co-editor of the popular journal Minerva. He wrote numerous articles for these journals, many of them overtly critical of the government, as well as translations of texts by the English philosopher Francis Bacon. In 1800 he emigrated to the Danish West Indies.
