= WKSK (AM) =

- West Jefferson, North Carolina; United States
- Frequencies: 580 kHz & 93.5 MHz

Programming
- Format: Country music
- Affiliations: ABC Radio News; Motor Racing Network; Performance Racing Network

Ownership
- Owner: Caddell Broadcasting, Inc.

History
- First air date: 1959
- Call sign meaning: Initials of owner Jim Childress' daughter Suzanne

Technical information
- Facility ID: 8146
- Class: D
- Power: 5,000 watts day 34 watts night
- Transmitter coordinates: 36°24′39.00″N 81°29′46.00″W

Links
- Webcast: listen live
- Website: 580wksk.com

WKSK is an AM radio station in West Jefferson, North Carolina. It is operated by Caddell Broadcasting, Inc., and broadcasts on a frequency of 580 kHz and, as of June 2014, simulcast on 93.5 MHz in FM stereo. Its 5,000-watt AM signal covers Ashe County, North Carolina and extends into neighboring Watauga, Wilkes and Alleghany counties in North Carolina, Grayson County, Virginia and Johnson County, Tennessee.

The station's slogan is "Today's Country, Yesterday's Favorites."

WKSK's studios and transmitter are located off NC 194, on a hill overlooking West Jefferson that local residents have dubbed "radio hill." WKSK originally was licensed to broadcast only from sunrise to sunset. It now has authority to broadcast at night on a reduced signal, though its post-7 p.m. broadcasts are restricted to coverage of local high school football and basketball games. Most hours begin with ABC News Radio

== History ==
WKSK went on the air in 1959, at 1600 kHz and with only a signal of 500 watts. In the 1980s, the station had the opportunity to increase its signal strength to 1,000 watts, which required changing its frequency to 580 kHz. In 2001, signal strength was raised again, to its present level of 5,000 watts.

In the 1960s, WKSK carried an eclectic mix of programming of gospel, country and pop music. From 3-5 p.m. each weekday the station aired the teen-oriented K-Club, featuring the latest hits of Herman's Hermits, the Dave Clark Five, Peter and Gordon and other pop groups of that decade. At 5 p.m., the station aired Our Best To You, a selection of easy listening music. Our Best To You continued until the station's sign-off, which in the winter months would be as early as 5:15 p.m.

In the 1970s and 1980s, the station migrated to its current all-country format. WKSK still broadcasts a daily program of gospel music, daily obituary reports, and locally produced religious programs on Sunday mornings.

In 2008, US Congresswoman Virginia Foxx honored WKSK for its service to Ashe County, NC, in a 1-minute speech on the floor of the United States House of Representatives. Her remarks were as follows:

Mr. Speaker,

I rise today to honor a pillar of the Ashe County, North Carolina, community, WKSK radio and its owner Jan Caddell. Most of the Fifth District of North Carolina is a rural landscape, and beautiful, mountainous Ashe County is no exception.

As people who live in rural America well know, local radio stations are often the lifeblood of vital community life. WKSK radio is just such a radio station, and recent audience measurement results illustrate just that. According to these results, WKSK has the most loyal local audience in its home county of any station in North Carolina.

Next year, WKSK will celebrate the 50-year mark of service to the people of Ashe County. The fact that nearly 55 percent of listeners in Ashe tune their radios to WKSK, seven times more than the next closest station, is a true testament to the emphasis that WKSK places on serving Ashe County.

WKSK radio is a real community fixture, and I wish the station 50 more years of sterling service to the High Country.
