= WGON-LP =

- Slidell, Louisiana; United States
- Frequency: 103.7 MHz
- Branding: Grace Radio of Slidell

Programming
- Format: Religious

Ownership
- Owner: First Pentecostal Church of Slidell

Technical information
- Licensing authority: FCC
- Facility ID: 124637
- Class: L1
- ERP: 82 watts
- HAAT: 34 metres (112 ft)
- Transmitter coordinates: 30°17′3″N 89°45′42″W

Links
- Public license information: LMS
- Website: Official Website

WGON-LP (103.7 FM) is a radio station licensed to serve the community of Slidell, Louisiana. The station is owned by First Pentecostal Church of Slidell. It airs a religious format.

The station was assigned the WGON-LP call letters by the Federal Communications Commission on February 22, 2002.
