= WPVM-LP =

WPVM FM 103.7 (WPVM-LP)
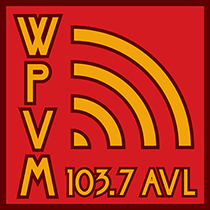

Asheville, North Carolina; United States
- Broadcast area: 20-mile radius over downtown Asheville, NC
- Frequency: 103.7 MHz
- Branding: The Voice of Asheville

Programming
- Languages: English
- Format: Free-form radio
- Affiliations: Pacifica Radio

Ownership
- Owner: Friends of WPVM, Inc.

History
- First air date: 2003; 22 years ago
- Former frequencies: 103.5 MHz (2003–2013)

Technical information
- Licensing authority: FCC
- Facility ID: 133357
- Class: L1
- ERP: 100 watts
- HAAT: 32.05 meters (105.2 ft)
- Transmitter coordinates: 35°35′48.8″N 82°13′19.2″W

Links
- Public license information: LMS
- Webcast: Listen live
- Website: wpvmfm.org

WPVM-LP (103.7 FM) is a non-commercial LPFM radio station licensed to Asheville, North Carolina. The station is owned by Friends of WPVM.

== History ==
WPVM's construction permit was issued by the Federal Communications Commission (FCC) on December 30, 2002. The station's first broadcast was in October 2003 under a Low Power FM Class 1 license for 100 watts effective radiated power (ERP). After years of financial problems, the station became dormant in 2011—2014. MAIN's board of directors subsequently voted to divest of WPVM to a newly-formed non-profit, Friends of WPVM, in October 2014. One of MAIN's directors attempted to prevent the transfer. There were several other allegations made against several parties during the dispute, one of which resulted in a $500,000 defamation suit against one board member. Despite the controversy that ensued, the FCC approved the license transfer on May 8, 2015.

After acquiring the license, Friends of WPVM's board, began a concerted effort to remedy the station's financial problems and replace its outdated equipment. As part of the group's improvements, the station moved from an apartment building to new quarters in the Self-Help Building in downtown Asheville.
