= City Park Radio =

City Park Radio (7LTN)
- Launceston, Tasmania; Australia
- Frequency: 103.7 MHz

Programming
- Format: Mixed

Ownership
- Owner: Launceston Community FM Group Inc.

History
- First air date: 7 April 1986
- Call sign meaning: 7 for Tasmania plus "Launceston"

Technical information
- Licensing authority: ACMA
- ERP: 2,000 watts
- Transmitter coordinates: 41.436520°S 147.098095°E
- Repeater: 96.5 FM Tamar Valley (500 watts ERP)

Links
- Public licence information: Profile
- Website: http://www.cityparkradio.com

City Park Radio is a community radio station in Launceston, Tasmania, Australia, broadcasting on the frequencies 103.7 FM and 96.5 FM. The station is a member of the Community Broadcasting Association of Australia.

City Park Radio started broadcasting on 7 April 1986, from facilities in Newnham as 7LTN-fm. In 1988, the station moved to the 100-year-old City Park Cottage in Launceston's City Park and started using the name City Park Radio. In 1993, work was started on a new studio complex behind the cottage.

As well as playing a significant cross-section of genres across the board, City Park Radio also has non-music programming, including the daily reading of articles from The Examiner, Launceston's local newspaper. The programming is heavily diversified to include programs in over ten languages. Current shows include general morning, afternoon and drivetime programs, and specialist shows such as Bad Habits Good Tracks, Addicted, Definitely No Relation, Side 1 Track 1 and Reelin' In The Years. City Park Radio also airs some pre-recorded segments, such as the award-winning Health Speak show, an interview-based program called Hot Seat, and occasional radio serials such as White Coolies, which was aired in 2021.

Inside City Park Radio's Cottage, the main building of the site that was once the park caretaker's residence, is a radio museum that holds a collection of over fifty radios dating from the early 1930s.

In September 1996, presenter Tim Moon broke the world record for "The Longest Single Continuous Broadcast By One Announcer". He was on air for 122 hours, 20 minutes and 3 seconds, breaking the previous record by just over 1 hour.
