= WBMZ (AM) =

- Metter, Georgia; United States
- Frequency: 1360 kHz
- Branding: Better 105.9

Programming
- Format: Sports radio

Ownership
- Owner: Dennis Jones; (RadioJones, LLC)

History
- First air date: 1964
- Former call signs: WMAC (1961–1998); WHCG (1998–2023); WEGC (2023–2026)

Technical information
- Licensing authority: FCC
- Facility ID: 54676
- Class: D
- Power: 1,000 watts day; 59 watts night
- Transmitter coordinates: 32°23′56.6″N 82°2′35.4″W
- Translator: 105.9 W290DI (Metter)

Links
- Public license information: Public file; LMS

WBMZ (1360 kHz) is an AM radio station broadcasting a sports radio format. Licensed to Metter, Georgia, United States, the station is owned by Dennis Jones, through licensee RadioJones, LLC.
