= WBMQ (FM) =

- Metter, Georgia; United States
- Frequency: 103.7 MHz
- Branding: 103.7 The Boomer

Programming
- Format: Classic hits
- Affiliations: Westwood One

Ownership
- Owner: Dennis Jones; (RadioJones, LLC)

History
- First air date: 1971
- Former call signs: WHCG (1971–1985); WQKK (1985-1988); WHCG (1988–1998); WHCG-FM (1998); WBMZ (1998–2026)

Technical information
- Licensing authority: FCC
- Facility ID: 73247
- Class: A
- ERP: 3,000 watts
- HAAT: 91 meters (299 ft)
- Transmitter coordinates: 32°23′56.6″N 82°2′35.4″W

Links
- Public license information: Public file; LMS
- Webcast: Listen live
- Website: 1037theboomer.com

WBMQ (103.7 MHz) is a FM radio station broadcasting a classic hits format. Licensed to Metter, Georgia, United States, the station serves the Metter, Statesboro, and Swainsboro areas. The station is owned by Dennis Jones, through licensee RadioJones, LLC, and features programming from Westwood One.

== History ==
The station was first licensed August 26, 1971, as WHCG. It changed its call sign to WQKK on July 4, 1985; back to WHCG on May 2, 1988; to WHCG-FM on June 12, 1998, to WBMZ on July 13, 1998; and to WBMQ on March 1, 2026.

Former logo

Between the fall of 2011 and the spring of 2013, and again since the fall of 2014, WBMZ has served as the official flagship radio station for Georgia Southern Eagles athletics, broadcasting football, men's and women's basketball and baseball games along with weekly coaches' shows.

WBMQ is hosted locally by Trey Dixon in the mornings and by station program director Steve Lawson in the afternoons.
