= Mayuli Martínez Simón =

Mexican politician (born 1984)

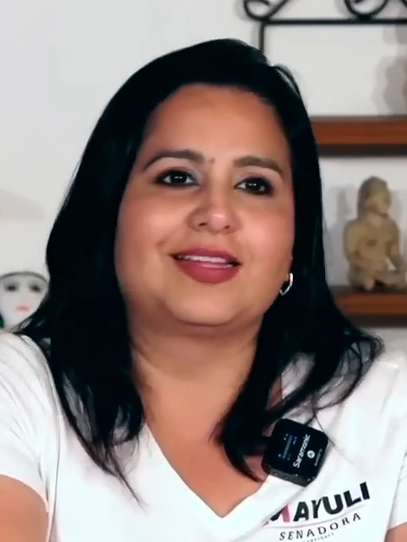

Senator for Quintana Roo
- Incumbent
- Assumed office 7 June 2021
- Preceded by: Laura Susana Martinez Cárdenas
- In office 1 September 2018 – 8 April 2021
- Preceded by: Luz María Beristain
- Succeeded by: Laura Susana Martinez Cárdenas

Personal details
- Born: Mayuli Latifa Martínez Simón; 13 January 1984 (age 42) Chetumal, Quintana Roo, Mexico
- Party: PAN
- Occupation: Politician

Mayuli Latifa Martínez Simón (born 13 January 1984) is a Mexican politician from the National Action Party (PAN). Since 2018 she has served as a Senator for Quintana Roo.

== Early years ==
Mayuli Latifa Martínez Simón was born on 13 January 1984 in Chetumal, Quintana Roo. She obtained a degree in law at the University of Quintana Roo.

== Political career ==
Martínez joined the National Action Party (PAN) in 2002. From 2013 to 2016, she was councilor of the municipality of Othón P. Blanco, during the municipal presidency of Eduardo Espinosa Abuxapqui. She was a deputy of the Quintana Roo State Congress in the XV Legislature representing the XV district, with headquarters in Chetumal as of 24 March 2016. Within congress, she was the coordinator of the PAN parliamentary group, was president of the anti-corruption commission, citizen participation and autonomous bodies. She was secretary of the legislative points commission and of the planning and economic development commission. On 27 March 2018, she requested leave of absence from the position to be able to participate in the 2018 federal elections.

=== Senator of the Republic ===
From 1 September 2018 to 8 April 2024, Martínez was a senator representing the Quintana Roo in the 64th and 65th Legislatures of the Congress of the Union as a representative of the first minority of Quintana Roo. Within the Senate, she served as chair of the Prime Legislative Studies Commission. She won re-election as Quintana Roo's third senator in the 2024 Senate election, occupying the first place on the Fuerza y Corazón por México coalition's two-name formula.
