= 2024 Mexican Senate election in Quintana Roo =

- 2 June 2024
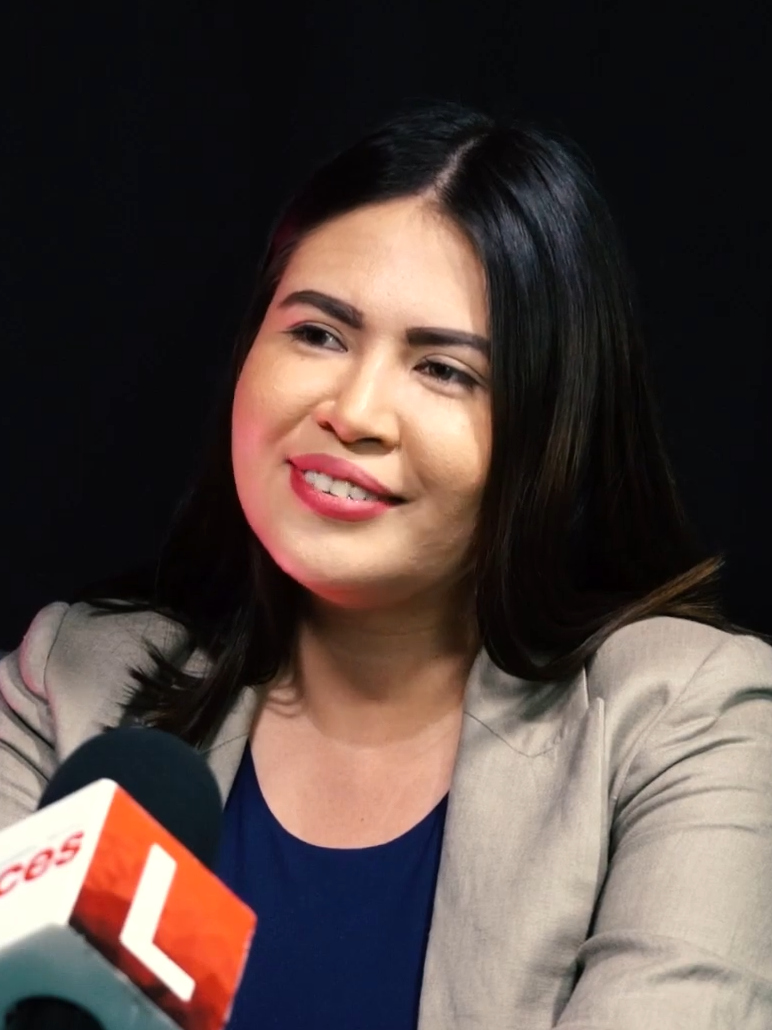

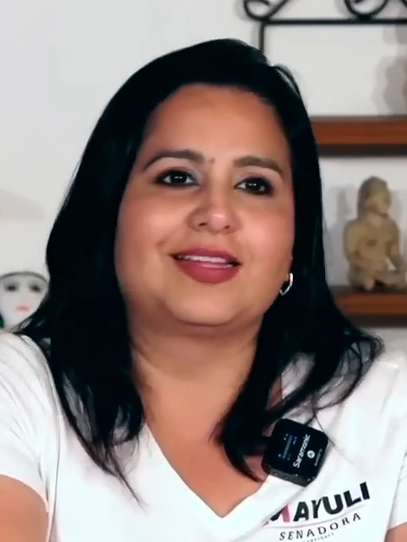

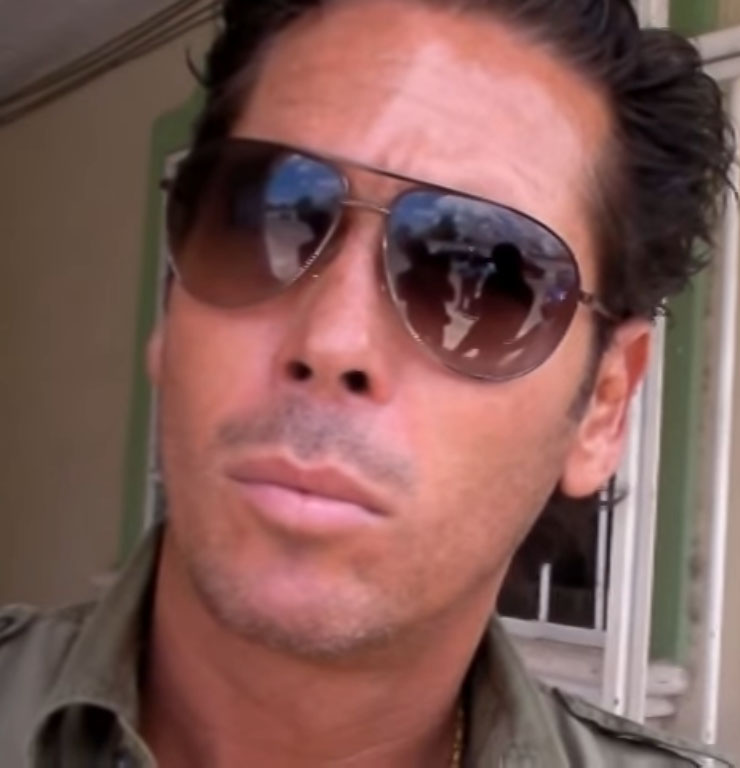

Nominee	Anahí González Hernández & Eugenio Segura Vázquez	Mayuli Martínez Simón & Cindy Yareli Cocom Dzidz	Roberto Palazuelos & Mayusa Isolina González Cauich
Party	Morena	PAN	MC
Alliance	Sigamos Haciendo Historia: Morena; Ecologist Green Party of Mexico (PVEM); Labor Party (PT)	Fuerza y Corazón por México: National Action Party (PAN); Institutional Revolutionary Party (PRI); Party of the Democratic Revolution (PRD)
Popular vote	555,829	148,348	82,294
Percentage	68.28%	18.22%	10.11%
Senator before election
Marybel Villegas Canche (Morena)
José Luis Pech Várguez (MC)
Mayuli Martínez Simón (PAN
Elected Senator
Anahí González Hernández (Morena)
Eugenio Segura Vázquez (Morena)
Mayuli Martínez Simón (PAN

The 2024 Mexican Senate election in Quintana Roo was held on 2 June 2024, to elect three new Senators to the Senate of the Republic, two elected by majority and one elected by first minority. In Mexico each candidacy to the Senate consists of two people.

The candidates of the Sigamos Haciendo Historia coalition, federal deputy Anahí González Hernández from Morena and Secretary of Finance and Planning of Quintana Roo Eugenio Segura Vázquez from Morena won the election, and incumbent Senator Mayuli Latifa Martínez Simón from the National Action Party was re-elected to the third seat.

== Results ==
2024 Senate election in Quintana Roo
Candidate	Alliance	Popular Vote	Percentage
Anahí González Hernández & Eugenio Segura Vázquez	Sigamos Haciendo Historia: Morena; Ecologist Green Party of Mexico (PVEM); Labor Party (PT)	555,829	68.28%
Mayuli Martínez Simón & Cindy Yareli Cocom Dzidz	Fuerza y Corazón por México: National Action Party (PAN); Institutional Revolutionary Party (PRI); Party of the Democratic Revolution (PRD)	148,348	18.22%
Roberto Palazuelos & Mayusa Isolina González Cauich	Citizens' Movement	82,294	10.11%
Write-ins		833	0.10%
Null votes		26,781	3.29%
Total		375,636	100.00%
