= Eduardo Ovando Martínez =

Mexican politician (born 1955)

- Born: October 13, 1955 (age 70); Chetumal, Quintana Roo, Mexico
- Occupation: Politician
- Political party: PRI

Eduardo Ovando Martínez (born 13 October 1955) is a Mexican politician affiliated with the Institutional Revolutionary Party. He served as Senator of the LVIII and LIX Legislatures of the Mexican Congress representing Quintana Roo, as a local deputy in the VI Legislature of the Congress of Quintana Roo, and as municipal president of Chetumal between 1999 and 2000.
