= 2nd federal electoral district of Quintana Roo =

Federal electoral district of Mexico

Quintana Roo's 2nd
- Electoral district of the Chamber of Deputies of Mexico

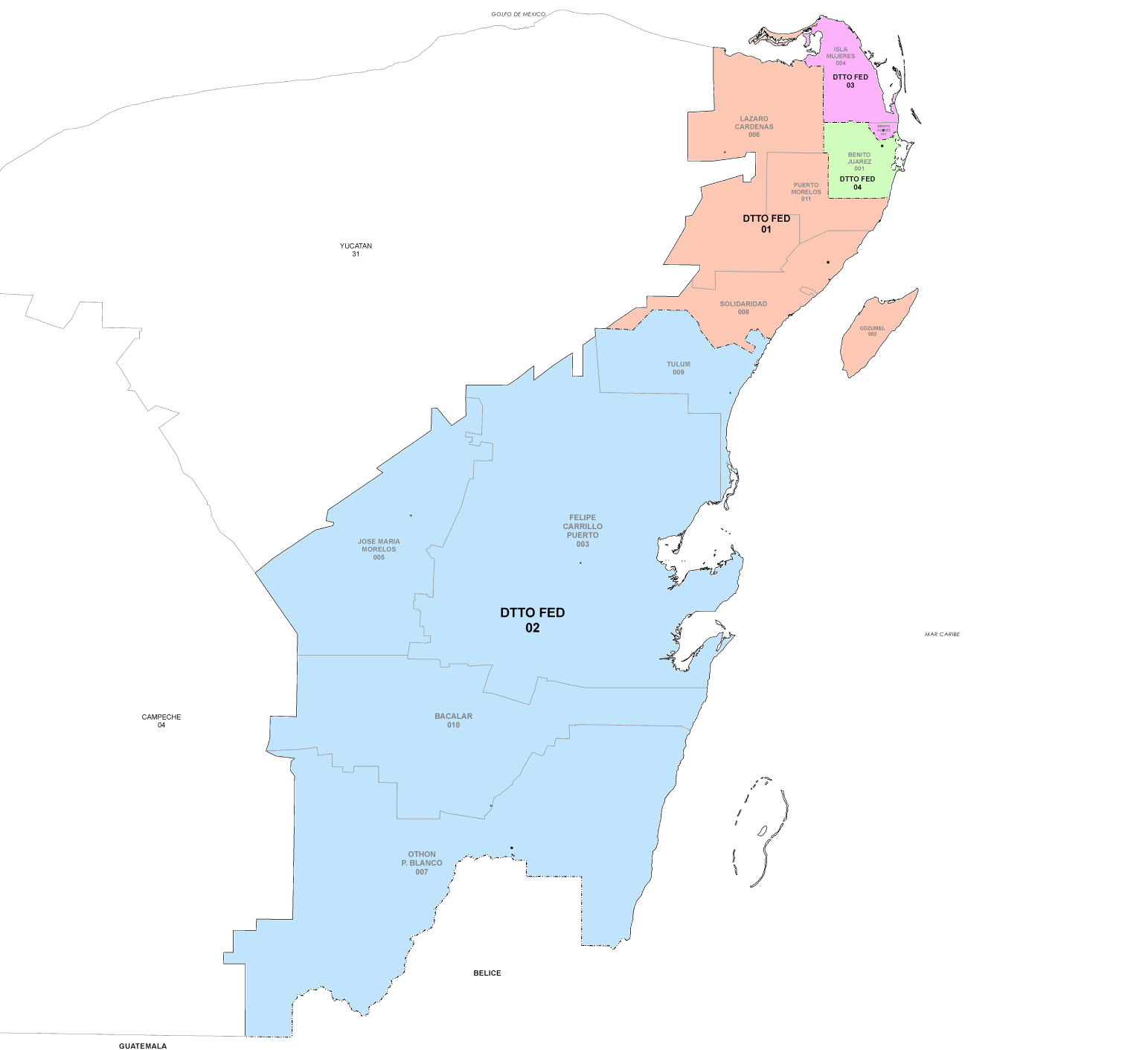
- 2nd district since 2023

Incumbent
- Member: Elda Xix Euan
- Party: ▌Morena
- Congress: 66th (2024–2027)

District
- State: Quintana Roo
- Head town: Chetumal
- Coordinates: 18°30′N 88°18′W
- Covers: Bacalar, Felipe Carrillo Puerto, José María Morelos, Othón P. Blanco, Tulum
- PR region: Third
- Precincts: 291
- Population: 445,278 (2020 census)
- Indigenous: Yes (49%)

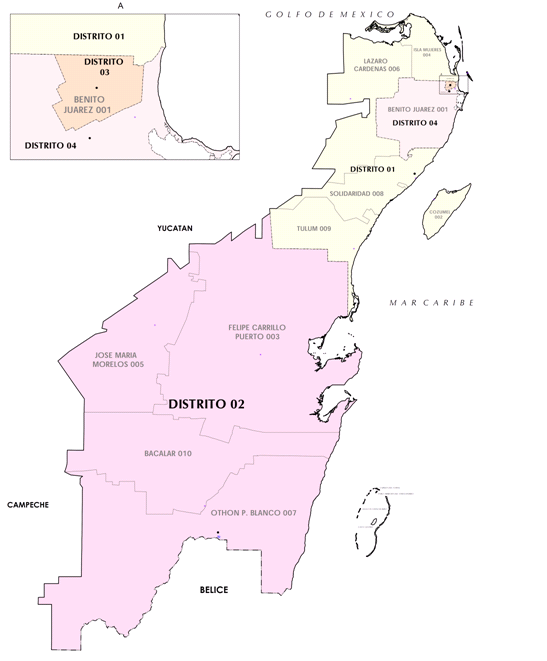
Quintana Roo under the 2017–2022 plan

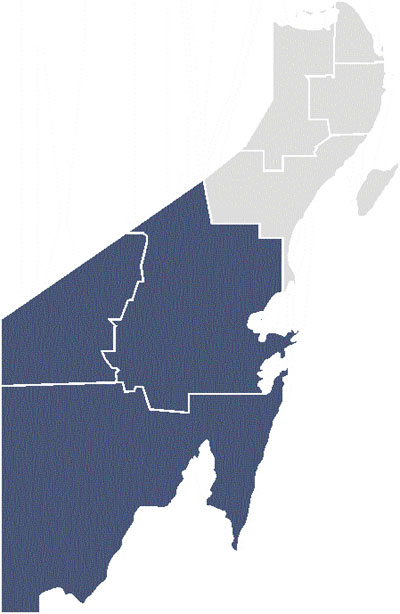
2nd district between 2005 and 2017

The 2nd federal electoral district of Quintana Roo (Spanish: Distrito electoral federal 02 de Quintana Roo) is one of the 300 electoral districts into which Mexico is divided for elections to the federal Chamber of Deputies and one of four such districts in the state of Quintana Roo.

It elects one deputy to the lower house of Congress for each three-year legislative session by means of the first-past-the-post system. Votes cast in the district also count towards the calculation of proportional representation ("plurinominal") deputies elected from the third region.

The district was created upon Quintana Roo's statehood in 1974.

The current member for the district, elected in the 2024 general election, is Elda María Xix Euan of the National Regeneration Movement (Morena).

== District territory ==
Under the 2023 districting plan adopted by the National Electoral Institute (INE), which is to be used for the 2024, 2027 and 2030 federal elections, the 2nd district covers 291 precincts (secciones electorales) across five of the state's 11 municipalities:

- Bacalar, Felipe Carrillo Puerto, José María Morelos, Othón P. Blanco and Tulum.

The head town (cabecera distrital), where results from individual polling stations are gathered together and tallied, is the state capital, the city of Chetumal. The district reported a population of 445,278 in the 2020 census and, with Indigenous and Afrodescendent inhabitants accounting for over 49% of that total, Quintana Roo's 2nd is classified by the INE as an indigenous district: the only one in the state. (Note: The INE deems any local or federal electoral district where Indigenous or Afrodescendent inhabitants number 40% or more of the total population to be an indigenous district.)

== Previous districting schemes ==
Evolution of electoral district numbers
	1973	1974	1978	1996	2005	2017	2023
Quintana Roo	1	2	2	2	3	4	4
Chamber of Deputies	194	196	300				

2017–2022

The 2017 redistricting process assigned Quintana Roo its 4th district. From 2017 to 2022, the 2nd district had its head town at Chetumal and it comprised four municipalities:
- Bacalar, Felipe Carrillo Puerto, José María Morelos and Othón P. Blanco.

2005–2017

The 2005 districting scheme created the state's 3rd district. Between 2005 and 2017, the 2nd district covered three municipalities: Othón P. Blanco, Felipe Carrillo Puerto and José María Morelos. The head town was the city of Chetumal.

1996–2005

Between 1996 and 2005, the district covered the same three municipalities as under the 2005 plan.

1978–1996

The districting scheme in force from 1978 to 1996 was the result of the 1977 electoral reforms, which increased the number of single-member seats in the Chamber of Deputies from 196 to 300; Quintana Roo's allocation, however, remained at two. The 2nd district's head town was at Cozumel and it comprised five of the state's (at the time) seven municipalities:
- Benito Juárez, Cozumel, Felipe Carrillo Puerto, Isla Mujeres and Lázaro Cárdenas.

Prior to 1978

Quintana Roo was admitted to the union on 8 October 1974. Prior to that, as a federal territory, it was allowed only one seat in the Chamber of Deputies (for the 1st district). The 2nd district was created upon statehood in 1974, by halving the territory of the first district; it elected its first deputy in a special election in 1974.

== Deputies returned to Congress ==
(Mexico) National parties
- Current
- PAN
- PRI
- PT
- PVEM
- MC
- Morena
- PAZ
- Somos
- Defunct or local only
- PLM
- PNR
- PRM
- PNM
- PP
- PPS
- PARM
- PFCRN
- CON
- PANAL
- PSD
- PES
- PES
- PRD

Quintana Roo's 2nd district
Election	Deputy	Party	Term	Legislature
1974	Héctor Esquiliano Solís	Institutional Revolutionary Party	1974–1976	49th Congress
1976	Emilio Oxté Tah	Institutional Revolutionary Party	1976–1979	50th Congress
1979	Alonso Alcocer Primitivo	Institutional Revolutionary Party	1979–1982	51st Congress
1982	Javier Sánchez Lozano	Institutional Revolutionary Party	1982–1985	52nd Congress
1985	Salvador Ramos Bustamante	Institutional Revolutionary Party	1985–1988	53rd Congress
1988	Isidoro Victoriano Mendoza de la Cruz	Institutional Revolutionary Party	1988–1991	54th Congress
1991	Magaly Achach Solís	Institutional Revolutionary Party	1991–1994	55th Congress
1994	Virginia Betanzos Moreno	Institutional Revolutionary Party	1994–1997	56th Congress
1997	Artemio Caamal Hernández	Institutional Revolutionary Party	1997–2000	57th Congress
2000	Héctor Esquiliano Solís	Institutional Revolutionary Party	2000–2003	58th Congress
2003	Víctor Manuel Alcérreca Sánchez	Institutional Revolutionary Party	2003–2006	59th Congress
2006	Eduardo Espinosa Abuxapqui	Institutional Revolutionary Party	2006–2009	60th Congress
2009	Rosario Ortiz Yeladaqui (Note: Ortiz Yeladaqui resigned her seat on 5 April 2011.); Luis García Silva	Institutional Revolutionary Party	2009–2011; 2011–2012	61st Congress
2012	Raymundo King de la Rosa	Institutional Revolutionary Party	2012–2015	62nd Congress
2015	Arlet Mólgora Glover; María Hadad Castillo	Institutional Revolutionary Party	2015–2018	63rd Congress
2018	Carmen Patricia Palma Olvera	National Regeneration Movement	2018–2021	64th Congress
2021	Anahí González Hernández	National Regeneration Movement	2021–2024	65th Congress
2024	Elda María Xix Euan	National Regeneration Movement	2024–2027	66th Congress

== Presidential elections ==
Quintana Roo's 2nd district
Election	District won by	Party or coalition	%
2018	Andrés Manuel López Obrador	Juntos Haremos Historia	63.2716
2024	Claudia Sheinbaum Pardo	Sigamos Haciendo Historia	74.4367
