= Héctor Esquiliano Solís =

Mexican politician (born 1951)

Deputy of the Congress of the Union for the 2nd district of the Quintana Roo
- In office 1 September 2000 – 31 August 2003
- Preceded by: Artemio Caamal Hernández
- Succeeded by: Víctor Manuel Alcérreca
- In office 1974 – 31 August 1976
- Preceded by: district creation
- Succeeded by: Emilio Oxte Tah

Personal details
- Born: 31 October 1951 (age 74) Chetumal, Quintana Roo, Mexico
- Party: PRI
- Occupation: Politician

Héctor Nemesio Esquiliano Solís (born 31 October 1951) is a Mexican politician from the Institutional Revolutionary Party (PRI). While studying as a medical surgeon at the National Autonomous University of Mexico (UNAM), Esquiliano served in the Chamber of Deputies during the 49th session of Congress representing Quintana Roo's newly created second district. From 1999 to 2000 he served as a president of the Congress of Quintana Roo. He returned to the national congress during the 58th session for the same district.
