= María Cristina Sangri Aguilar =

Mexican politician (1941–2022)

Member of the Chamber of Deputies of Mexico
- In office 1 September 1988 – August 1991
- Preceded by: Artemio Caamal Hernández
- Succeeded by: Mario Villanueva
- Constituency: Quintana Roo
- In office 1 September 1985 – 31 August 1988
- Preceded by: Sara Muza Simón
- Succeeded by: Elina Elfi Coral Castilla
- Constituency: First Federal Electoral District of Quintana Roo

Municipal president of Othón P. Blanco
- In office 10 April 1981 – 9 April 1984
- Preceded by: Hernán Pastrana Pastrana
- Succeeded by: Alfredo Díaz Jiménez

Personal details
- Born: 1 January 1941 Chetumal, Quintana Roo, Mexico
- Died: 15 January 2022 (aged 81) Chetumal, Quintana Roo, Mexico
- Party: PRI

María Cristina Sangri Aguilar (1 January 1941 – 15 January 2022) was a Mexican politician.

A member of the Institutional Revolutionary Party (PRI), she served in the Chamber of Deputies and Senate from 1985 to 1991. Before that, she served in the Congress of Quintana Roo and was the first female municipal president in the state. She died in Chetumal on 15 January 2022, at the age of 81.
