= Luis García Silva =

Mexican politician (born 1968)

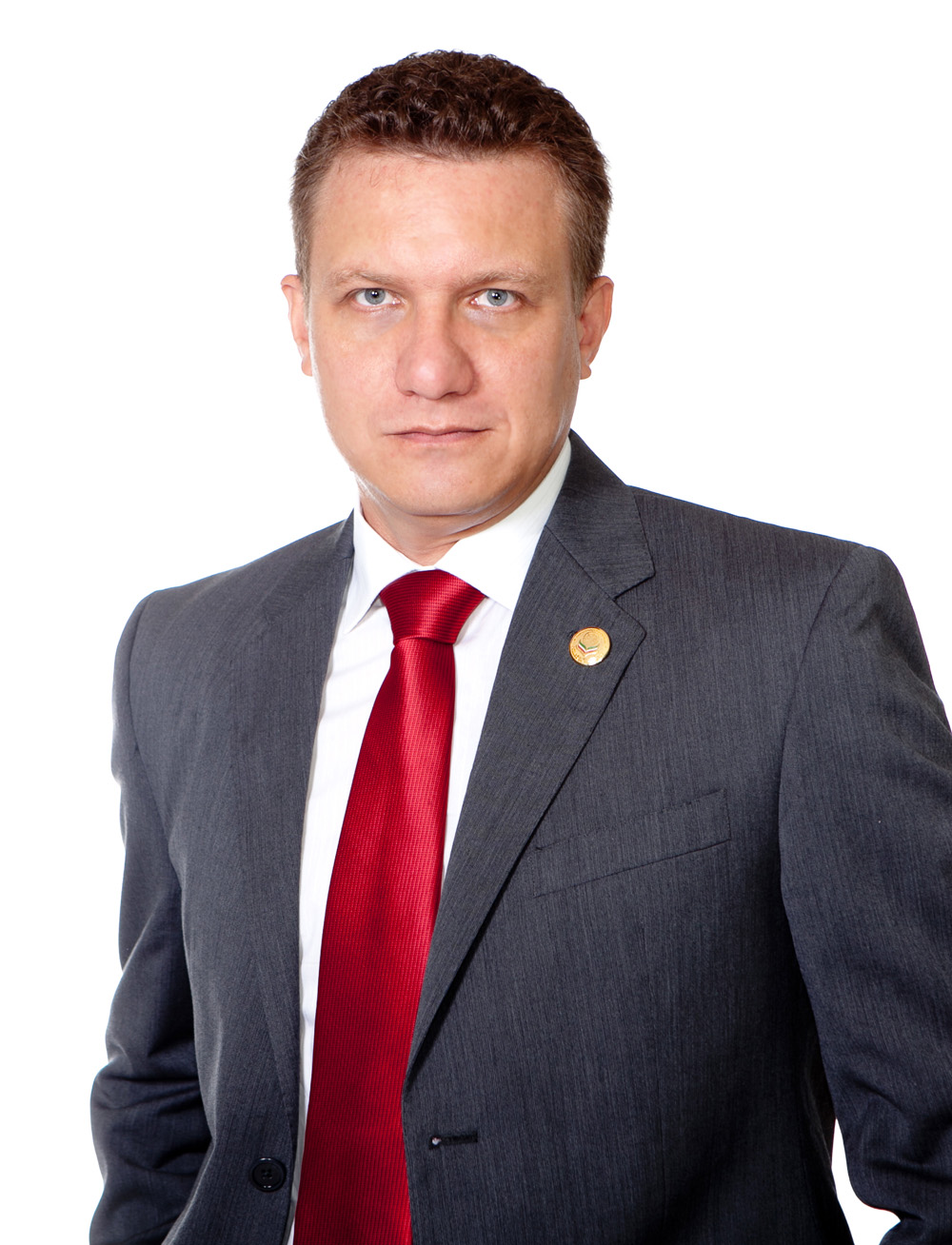
- Luis García Silva in 2011
- Born: 3 March 1968 (age 58); Chetumal, Quintana Roo, Mexico
- Occupation: Politician
- Political party: PRI

Luis García Silva (born 3 March 1968) is a Mexican politician from the Institutional Revolutionary Party (PRI). From 2011 to 2012 he sat in the Chamber of Deputies representing Quintana Roo's second district as the alternate of Rosario Ortiz Yeladaqui.
