= Anahí González Hernández =

Mexican politician

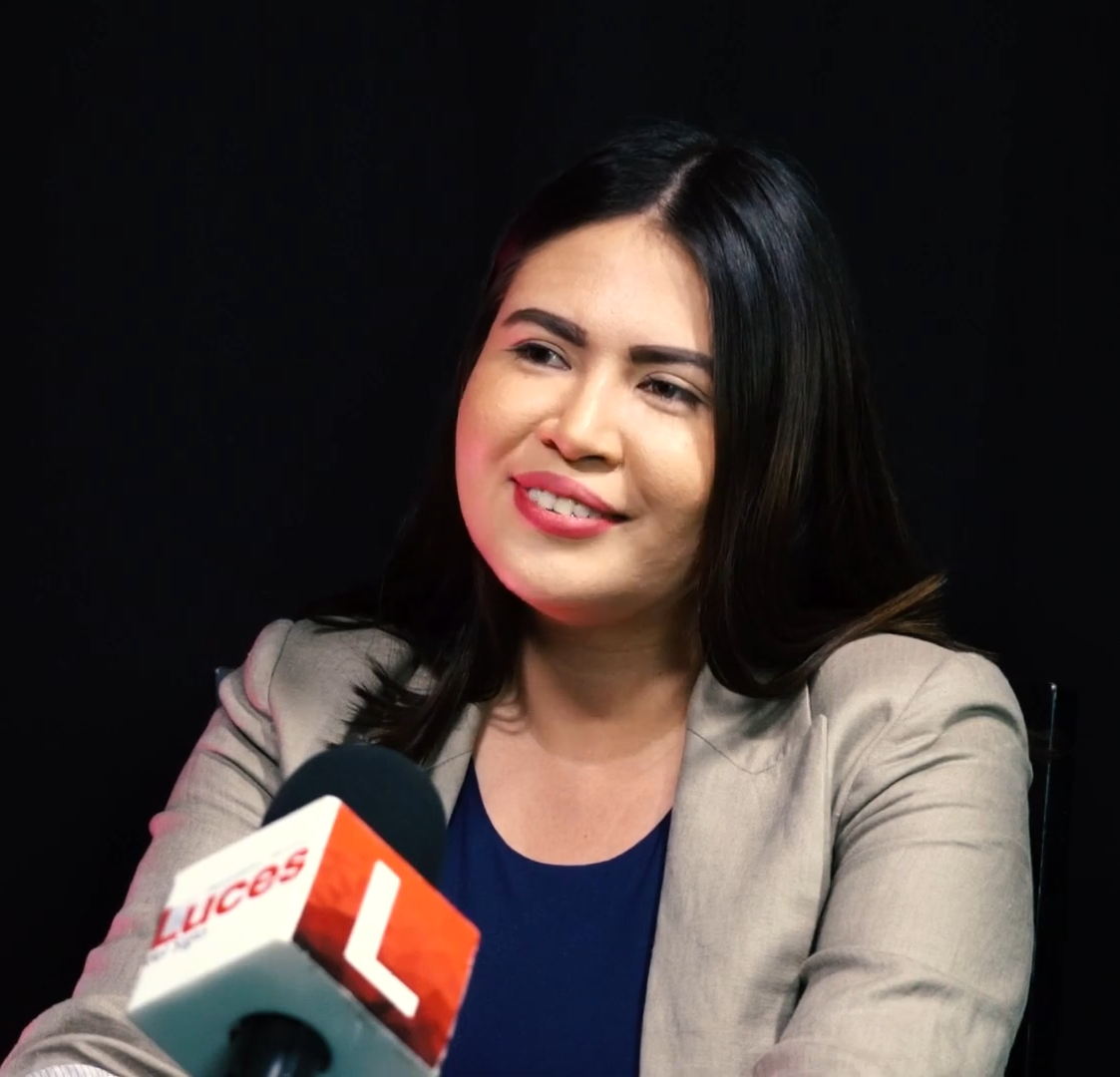
Anahí González en el Podcast "Luces del Siglo"

Anahí González Hernández (born April 6, 1992) is a Mexican politician, member of the National Regeneration Movement party (Morena). From September 2021 to August 2024, she sat in the Chamber of Deputies during the 65th session of the Congress of the Union. In September 2024, she assumed one of Quintana Roo's seats in the Senate for the 66th session.

== Early years ==
Alma Anahí González Hernández was born in Cancún, Quintana Roo. She studied for a bachelor's degree in psychology at Universidad La Salle México. From 2018 to 2021, she was councilor of the municipality of Benito Juárez, Quintana Roo, during the municipal presidency of Mara Lezama.

== Federal legislator ==
In the 2021 federal elections, she was nominated by the National Regeneration Movement party as a federal deputy for district 2 of the state of Quintana Roo, based in Chetumal. She held the position in the 65th session of the Congress of the Union from September 2021 to August 2024. Within the congress, she was the secretary of the tourism commission.

González Hernández won election as one of Quintana Roo's senators in the 2024 Senate election, occupying the first place on the Sigamos Haciendo Historia coalition's two-name formula.
