= Víctor Manuel Alcérreca =

Mexican politician

Member of the Chamber of Deputies for Quintana Roo's 2nd district
- In office 1 September 2003 – 31 August 2006
- Preceded by: Héctor Esquiliano Solís
- Succeeded by: Eduardo Espinosa Abuxapqui

Personal details
- Born: 3 January 1941 (age 85) Cozumel, Quintana Roo, Mexico
- Party: PRI
- Occupation: Politician

Víctor Manuel Alcérreca Sánchez (born 3 January 1941) is a Mexican politician affiliated with the Institutional Revolutionary Party (PRI). In the 2003 mid-terms he was elected to the Chamber of Deputies to represent Quintana Roo's second district during the 59th session of Congress.
