= Magaly Achach Solís =

Mexican politician (1955–2026)

Member of the Chamber of Deputies of Mexico for the Quintana Roo's 2nd district
- In office 1 November 1991 – 31 October 1994
- Preceded by: Isidoro Victoriano Mendoza de la Cruz
- Succeeded by: Virginia Betanzos Moreno

Personal details
- Born: Sonia Magaly Achach Solís; 4 March 1955 Tecoh, Yucatán, Mexico
- Died: 10 April 2026 (aged 71) Cancún, Quintana Roo, Mexico
- Party: PRI
- Occupation: Teacher

Sonia Magaly Achach Solís (Note: In this Mexican name, the surname is Achach and the second or maternal family name is Solís.) (4 March 1955 – 10 April 2026) was a Mexican politician from the Institutional Revolutionary Party (PRI)

A native of Tecoh, Yucatán, she served in the Chamber of Deputies from 1991 to 1994, representing Quintana Roo's 2nd district. She later served as first woman municipal president of Benito Juárez, Quintana Roo, from 1999 to 2001.

Achach died in Cancún, Quintana Roo, on 10 April 2026, at the age of 71.
