= Eduardo Espinosa Abuxapqui =

Mexican politician

Member of the Chamber of Deputies for Quintana Roo's 2nd district
- In office 1 September 2006 – 31 August 2009
- Preceded by: Víctor Manuel Alcérreca
- Succeeded by: Rosario Ortiz Yeladaqui

Personal details
- Born: 11 April 1954 (age 71) Chetumal, Quintana Roo, Mexico
- Party: PRI
- Occupation: Politician

Eduardo Elías Espinosa Abuxapqui (born 11 April 1954) is a Mexican politician from the Institutional Revolutionary Party (PRI). In the 2006 general election he was elected to the Chamber of Deputies to represent Quintana Roo's second district during the 60th session of Congress. He had previously served as the municipal president of Othón P. Blanco from 2002 to 2005.
