= Raymundo King =

Mexican politician

- Born: 18 December 1976 (age 49); Chetumal, Quintana Roo, Mexico
- Occupation: Politician
- Political party: PRI

Raymundo King de la Rosa (born 18 December 1976) is a Mexican politician affiliated with the Institutional Revolutionary Party (PRI). In the 2012 general election he was elected to the Chamber of Deputies to represent Quintana Roo's second district during the 62nd session of Congress.
