= Wadi Amar Shabshab =

Mexican politician

- Born: 26 February 1947 (age 79); Chetumal, Quintana Roo, Mexico
- Occupation: Politician
- Political party: PAN

Wadi Amar Shabshab (born 26 February 1947) is a Mexican politician affiliated with the National Action Party. As of 2014 he served as Senator of the LVIII and LIX Legislatures of the Mexican Congress representing Quintana Roo.

In 2020 his family reported to the attorney general that he had been kidnapped, and he was rescued from a hotel in Playa del Carmen a few hours later.
