= Rosario Ortiz Yeladaqui =

Mexican politician

Eusebia del Rosario Ortiz Yeladaqui is a Mexican politician from Quintana Roo, affiliated with the Institutional Revolutionary Party (PRI), who served in the cabinet of Governor Félix González Canto.

== Political career ==
Ortiz Yeladaqui is a PRI member from Quintana Roo who has occupied different positions both inside her party and in the Quintana Roo public service. From 1990 to 1993 she served as municipal president of Othón P. Blanco, succeeding her brother. She has also served as local deputy in the Congress of Quintana Roo and as president of the PRI in her home state.

In 2006 Governor Félix González Canto designated her as the head of the Quintana Roo Secretariat of Government (Spanish: Secretaría de Gobierno).

In the 2009 mid-terms she was elected to the Chamber of Deputies to represent Quintana Roo's second district during the 61st session of Congress.

Preceded by Efraín Ortiz Yeladaqui	Municipal president of Othón P. Blanco, Quintana Roo; 1990—1993	Succeeded by Diego E. Rojas Zapata
