= Gino Segura =

Mexican politician

Eugenio Segura Vázquez (born 7 February 1994) is a Mexican politician, member of the National Regeneration Movement (Morena). Born in Cancún, Quintana Roo, he has served as the Secretary of Finance and Planning and Senator from Quintana Roo in the Congress of the Union.

In 2026, Morena announced him as the "state coordinator for the defense of the transformation and national sovereignty", a position expected to represent the party in the Quintana Roo gubernatorial election of 6 June 2027.
