= Chetumal =

Chetumal Chactemàal (Yucatec Maya)
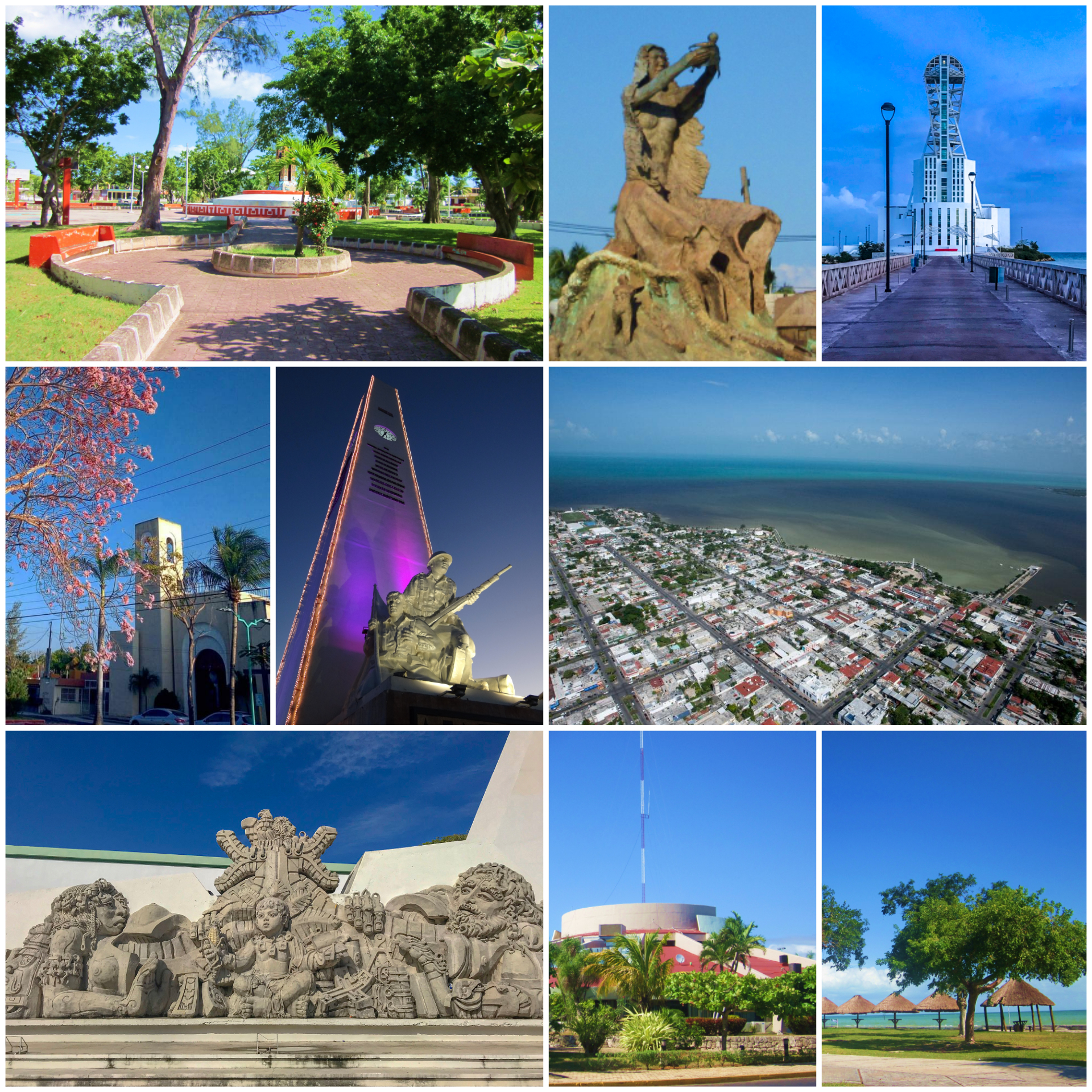
- From the top to the left: Parque de los Caimanes, Monumento al Renacimiento, Faro, Catedral, Torre del Reloj y Monumento militar, Vista aérea, Alegoría del mestizaje, Congreso de Quintana Roo and Dos Mulas beach

- Location in Mexico Chetumal (Mexico)
- Coordinates: 18°30′13″N 88°18′19″W
- Country: Mexico
- State: Quintana Roo
- Municipality: Othón P. Blanco
- Founded: May 5, 1898 (Othon P. Blanco)
- Current site: 1898

Government
  - Mayor: Gregorio Hernán Pastrana

Area
  - Total: 35.83 km^{2} (13.83 sq mi)
- Elevation: 10 m (33 ft)

Population (2020)
  - Total: 169,028
  - Density: 4,717/km^{2} (12,220/sq mi)
  - Demonym: Chetumaleño(a)
- Time zone: UTC−05:00 (Zona Sureste)
- Postal code: 77000
- Area codes: +52 983, 912
- Website: www.chetumal.gob.mx

Chetumal (UK: /ˌtʃɛtʊˈmɑːl/, US: /ˌtʃeɪtuˈ-/, Spanish: [tʃetuˈmal]; Yucatec Maya: Chactemàal [tɕʰaktʰe̞mɐː˨˩l], lit. '"Place of the Red Wood"') is the capital city of the state of Quintana Roo in Mexico, and the municipal seat of the Municipality of Othón P. Blanco. In 2020 it had a population of 169,028 people, making it the third most-populous city in Quintana Roo, after Cancun and Playa Del Carmen.

The city is located on the east coast of the Yucatán Peninsula, situated on the western side of Chetumal Bay, near the mouth of the Río Hondo. Chetumal is an important port for the region and operates as Mexico's main trading gateway with the neighboring country of Belize. Goods are transported via a road connecting Chetumal with Belize City to the south, and also via coastal merchant ships. There is a commercial airport, Chetumal International Airport, with airline service. Because of its location on the Caribbean coastline, it is vulnerable to tropical cyclones; Hurricane Janet and Hurricane Dean, both Category 5 storms, made landfall near Chetumal in 1955 and 2007 respectively.

== History ==
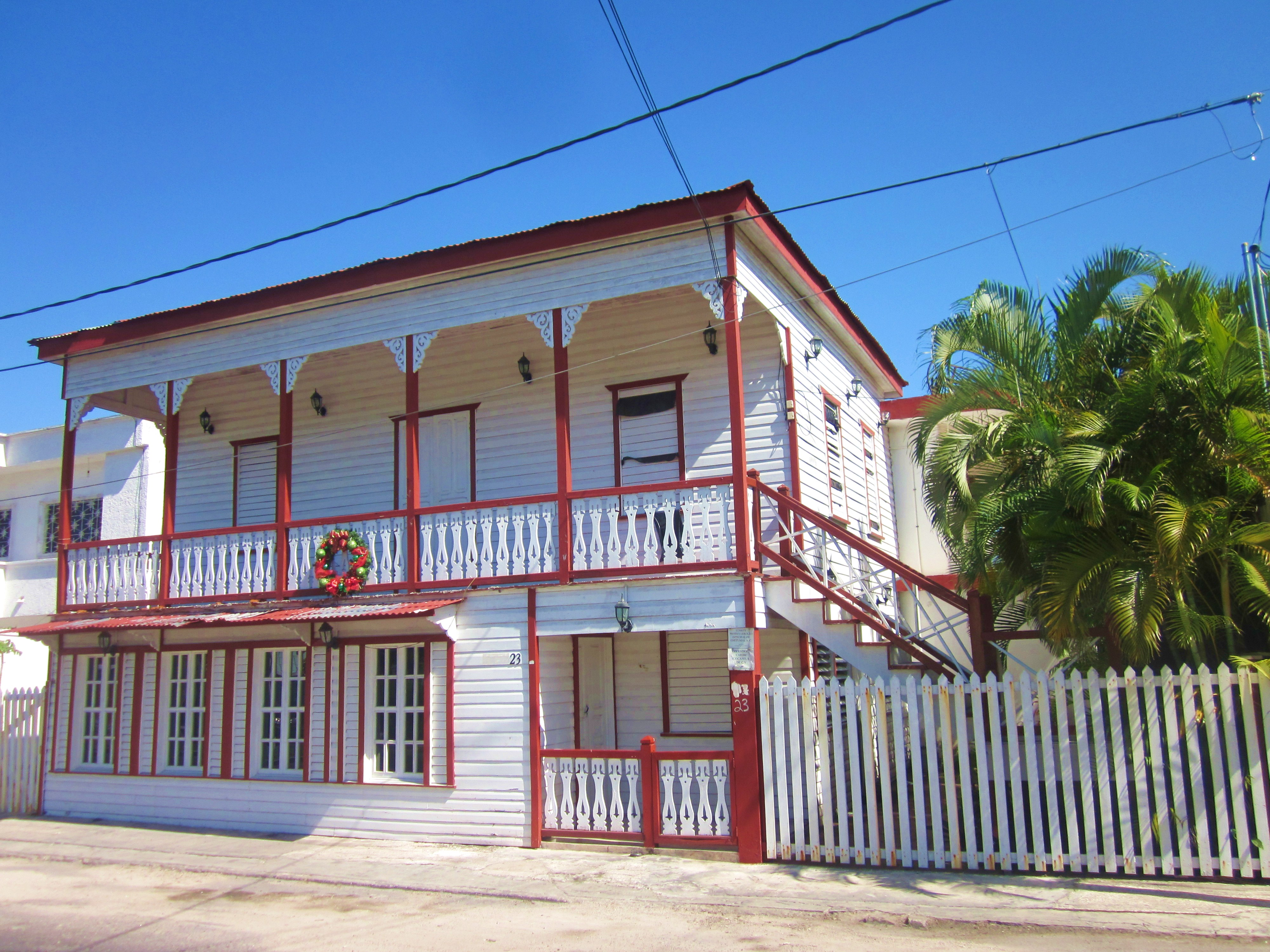
Chetumal has become known for its traditional wood buildings, few of which survive.

In Pre-Columbian times, a city called Chactemal (sometimes rendered as "Chetumal" in early European sources), probably today's Santa Rita in Belize, was the capital of a Maya state of the same name that roughly controlled the southern quarter of modern Quintana Roo and the northeast portion of Belize. This original Chetumal is now believed to have been on the other side of the Río Hondo, in modern Belize, not at the site of modern chetumal.

During the Spanish conquest of Yucatán, the Maya state of Chetumal fought off several Spanish expeditions before finally being subjugated in the late 16th century.

The 1840s revolt of the indigenous Maya people against Mexican rule, known as the Caste War of Yucatán, drove all the Hispanic people from this region; many settled in Corozal Town, British Honduras (modern Belize).

The current site of Chetumal was established as a Mexican port town in 1898, originally under the name Payo Obispo. At the invitation of founder Othon P. Blanco, the early town was populated by settlers from Belize (including Caste War refugees and Englishmen).

The name of the town was officially changed to Chetumal in 1936.

Two hurricanes in the 1940s leveled the entire town; Chetumal was devastated a third time in 1955 by Hurricane Janet. After this, the town was rebuilt with more solid construction, with concrete blocks replacing wood as the usual material.

The population of Chetumal was small (about 5,000 in 1950) until the construction of highways linking it to the rest of Mexico in the 1960s and 1970s; the city then boomed with substantial migration from other parts of Mexico.

=== Foundation ===
The government of Porfirio Díaz decided to end the Maya revolt situation, resolving to fight the rebel Maya and to achieve this it definitively established the boundaries with British Honduras at the Rio Hondo, according to a treaty signed in 1893, also separated the new one from the state of Yucatan Federal Territory of Quintana Roo and sent the army to fight the Maya.

The first step in combating them was to prevent the trafficking of arms from Belize and to assert Mexican sovereignty at that end of the territory, so it was decided to build a fort and customs section at the point where the Hondo River feeds into Chetumal Bay, which they named Payo Obispo in honor of Payo Enríquez de Rivera, who as bishop of Guatemala had visited the region in the 1660s. An officer of the navy, Othón P. Blanco, suggested that as it was an unexplored place and without any certainty of what the terrain would be like, it would be better to send to the place a pontoon then anchored at the point of the bay or the Hondo River, which could serve as a barracks and customs section while a permanent establishment was being achieved, as the pontoon would allow for rapid mobility and increased surveillance. Blanco's suggestion was accepted and he was also appointed command of such pontoon and chief of the operation; the pontoon was built in New Orleans and Blanco gave it the name Pontón Chetumal, in memory of the Maya name for the region. He left New Orleans in late 1897 and, after making stops in Progreso, Yucatan and Cozumel, arrived at the mouth of the Hondo River on 22 January 1898!

Othón P. Blanco quickly organized the garrison and ordered the clearing of the coast, covered with mangrove, to establish a permanent population on the mainland, and also came into contact with Mexicans residing in Corozal and survivors of the Bacalar massacre and communicated their intentions to establish a new population, inviting them to return to Mexico.

Finally, Othón P. Blanco officially founded the new town, on 5 May 1898, with neighbors from Corozal and other parts of the peninsula and gave it the name Payo Obispo', as the region was already known. On the origin of this name it is mentioned that it comes from Fray Payo Enríquez de Rivera, who was Archbishop of Mexico and Viceroy of New Spain, but that when he was Bishop of Guatemala he came to pay a visit to Bacalar, landing at the point that received his name.

=== Early years ===
Payo Obispo was in the beginning a small border town, mainly dedicated to border surveillance and whose economic activities were concentrated on the exploitation of jungle resources such as Manilkara zapota and chicle, communication with the interior was only by sea, to the port of Vigía Chico, where a railway linked with the capital of the territory, Santa Cruz de Bravo, or further north Cozumel or Progress.

The houses were woodland Caribbean English style, as in Belize or Jamaica, built above ground level and painted brightly and with wooden latticework on the windows. Drinking water was collected from the rain through cisterns, of which each house used to have one, although a large public cistern was later built.

=== Development ===
The final development of Payo Obispo occurred when the governor of Yucatan, Salvador Alvarado decided to return to the Maya the city of Santa Cruz de Bravo, which at that time belonged to Yucatan after the suppression of the Territory of Quintana Roo and that by being 1915 the capital was moved accordingly to Payo Obispo, thereby increasing population and economic activity, as government units were established in the population.

During the 1920s and 1930s, the exploration and development of Quintana Roo was greatly disseminated, as it was one of the last undeveloped places in the country and many considered it conducive to the establishment of the new models advocated by the Mexican Revolution, however, on the grounds of financial reasons, the federal government once again abolished the Quintana Roo Territory and divided it between Yucatan and Campeche, with Payo Obispo being left in the latter state, Payo Obispo then led the movement that demanded the restoration of federal territory, a request answered by Lázaro Cárdenas, who visited the city in 1934 as a candidate for president and who once had taken office, re-established the territory in 1935.

The new governor, Rafael E. Melgar, greatly promoted the development of the city, he is due the construction of the first concrete buildings, these being the Government Palace, the Morelos Hospital and the Belisario Domínguez School, also developed promoting the establishment of worker cooperatives dedicated to logging, rubber and chewing gum, among other products and which motivated the start of emigration to Quintana Roo, promoted in addition to increasing population of the territory. In addition, and according to the postulates of the time, Melgar decided to remove all names of religious origin to the towns and cities of the territory, being renamed Payo Obispo according to decree of 16 February 1937 with the new name of Chetumal. The development promoted by Melgar declined to a greater or lesser extent during the following governments and for various reasons, but the growth of the city continued to increase.

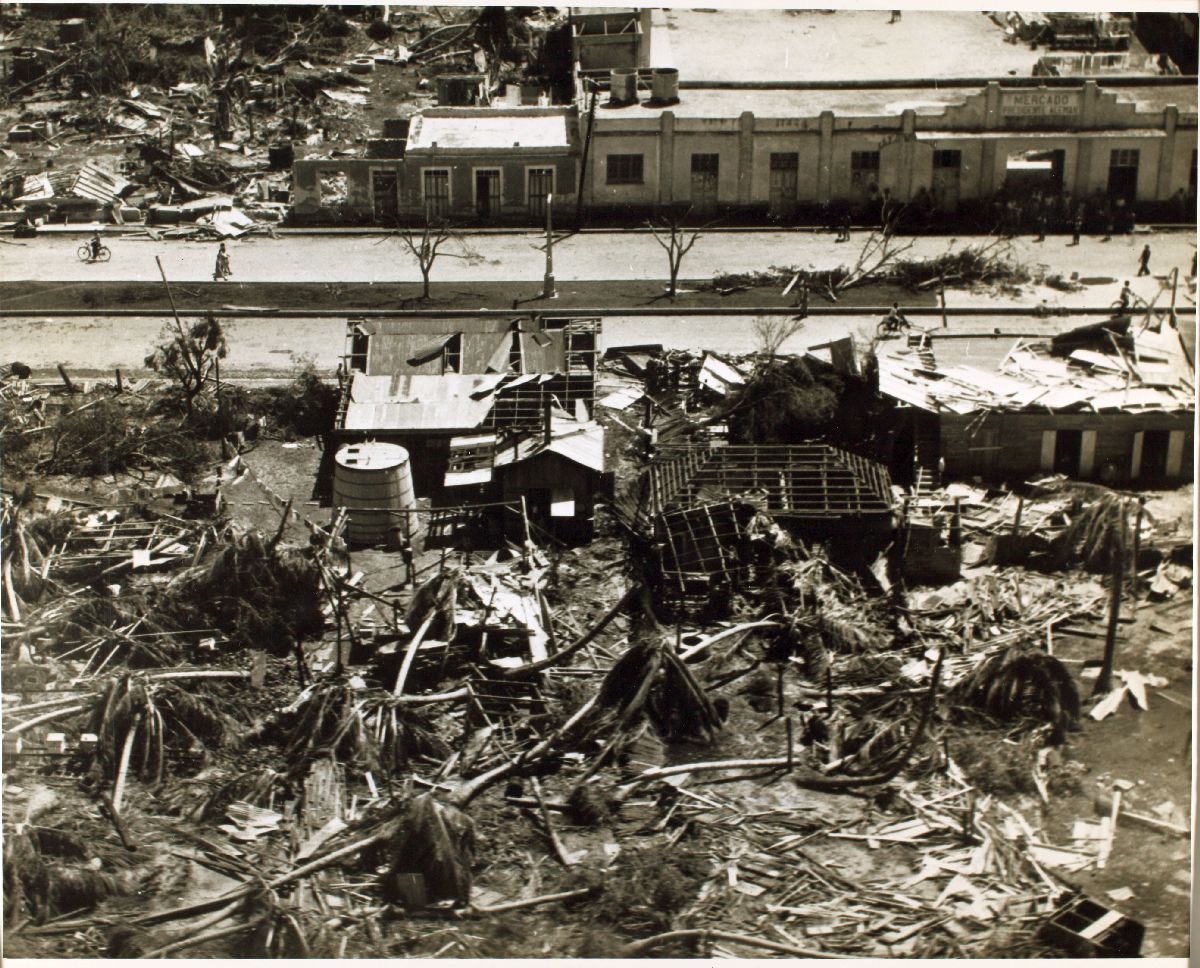
Hurricane Janet caused widespread damage in Chetumal

On 27 September 1955, the Category 5 Hurricane Janet struck the city, destroying it almost completely. Most wooden buildings were destroyed and around 500 inhabitants perished. After the hurricane, Chetumal was rebuilt as a modern city, leaving behind its Anglo-Caribbean wooden architecture.

During the governments of Aarón Merino Fernández, Javier Rojo Gómez and David Gustavo Gutiérrez, the development continued to establish electric light, paving and terrestrial communications, as well as a large emigration from other parts of the country, promoted by the federal government, especially that of Luis Echeverría Álvarez, with the intention of promoting the Federal Territory in state of the Federation, which was finally made on October 8 of 1974, becoming Chetumal in the capital of the new Quintana Roo state.

== Geography ==
=== Climate ===
Chetumal has a tropical savanna climate (Köppen Aw), with a pronounced wet season from May to October, and a dry season from November to April.

Climate data for Chetumal (1951–2010)
Month	Jan	Feb	Mar	Apr	May	Jun	Jul	Aug	Sep	Oct	Nov	Dec	Year
Record high °C (°F)	35.0 (95.0)	36.5 (97.7)	37.5 (99.5)	39.5 (103.1)	39.5 (103.1)	37.5 (99.5)	37.8 (100.0)	39.0 (102.2)	38.0 (100.4)	36.2 (97.2)	37.0 (98.6)	39.0 (102.2)	39.5 (103.1)
Mean daily maximum °C (°F)	28.5 (83.3)	29.5 (85.1)	30.7 (87.3)	32.1 (89.8)	32.7 (90.9)	32.3 (90.1)	32.4 (90.3)	32.8 (91.0)	32.5 (90.5)	31.5 (88.7)	30.0 (86.0)	28.8 (83.8)	31.2 (88.2)
Daily mean °C (°F)	23.4 (74.1)	24.4 (75.9)	26.1 (79.0)	27.9 (82.2)	28.7 (83.7)	28.6 (83.5)	28.5 (83.3)	28.6 (83.5)	28.3 (82.9)	27.0 (80.6)	25.2 (77.4)	23.8 (74.8)	26.7 (80.1)
Mean daily minimum °C (°F)	18.3 (64.9)	19.2 (66.6)	21.5 (70.7)	23.7 (74.7)	24.6 (76.3)	25.0 (77.0)	24.5 (76.1)	24.3 (75.7)	24.0 (75.2)	22.4 (72.3)	20.4 (68.7)	18.9 (66.0)	22.2 (72.0)
Record low °C (°F)	6.0 (42.8)	5.0 (41.0)	7.3 (45.1)	9.0 (48.2)	16.0 (60.8)	18.5 (65.3)	19.0 (66.2)	15.0 (59.0)	18.0 (64.4)	12.5 (54.5)	10.0 (50.0)	5.5 (41.9)	5.0 (41.0)
Average precipitation mm (inches)	64.4 (2.54)	35.9 (1.41)	26.4 (1.04)	36.4 (1.43)	128.0 (5.04)	192.7 (7.59)	146.1 (5.75)	143.7 (5.66)	206.8 (8.14)	169.0 (6.65)	92.8 (3.65)	65.4 (2.57)	1,307.5 (51.48)
Average precipitation days (≥ 0.1 mm)	9.1	5.8	3.8	3.8	8.0	13.6	14.0	13.5	15.8	14.4	11.1	10.1	123.0
Average relative humidity (%)	80	76	74	73	74	78	78	77	79	80	80	80	77
Mean monthly sunshine hours	211	231	259	272	276	218	225	236	204	218	206	205	2,761
Source 1: Servicio Meteorológico Nacional
Source 2: Deutscher Wetterdienst (sun, 1961–1990) (Note: Station ID for Chetumal, Q.R. is 76750 Use this station ID to locate the sunshine duration)

== Contemporary Chetumal ==
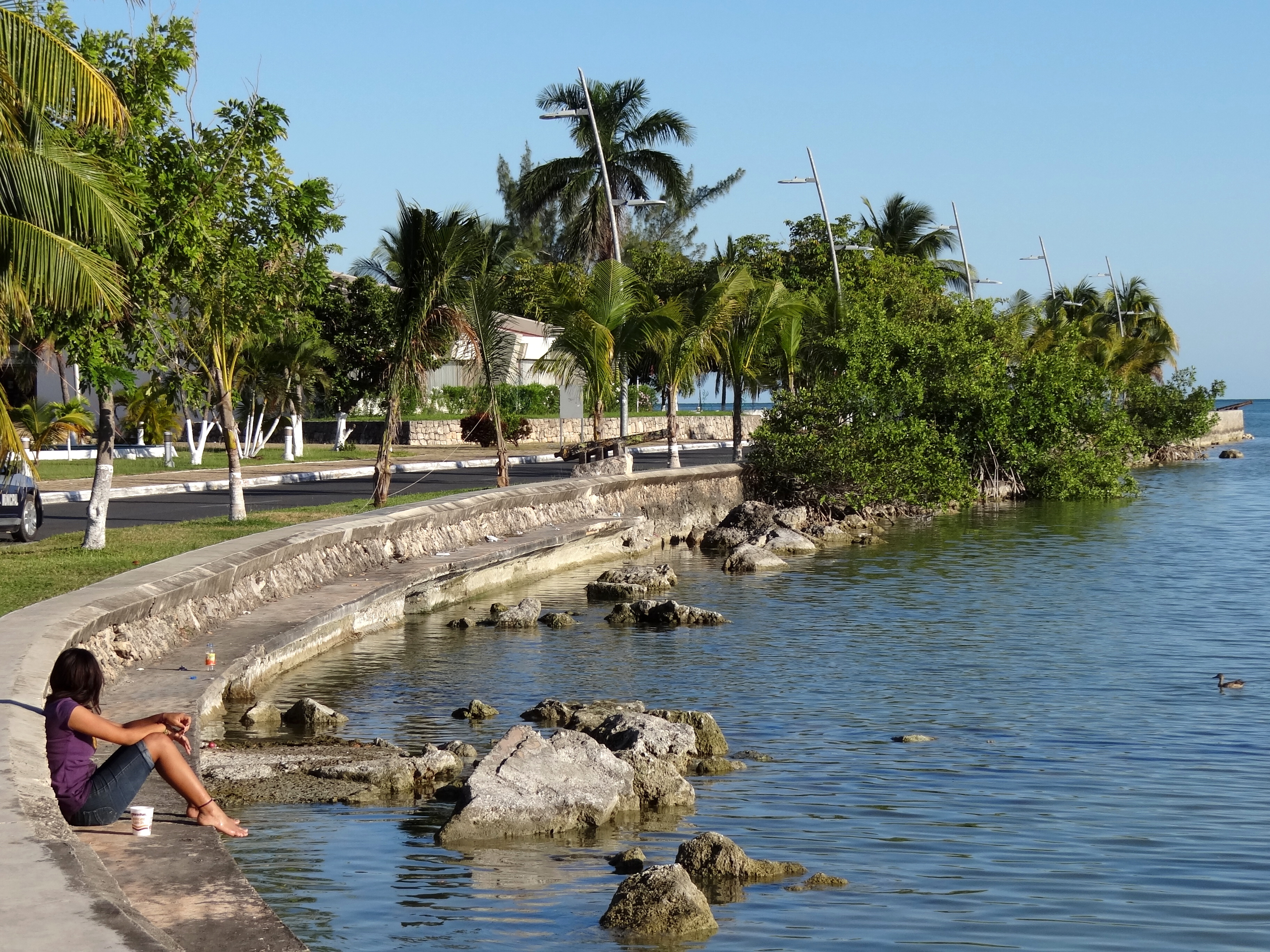
Along Boulevard Bahia, Chetumal

Chetumal is a growing city with an international airport. The city has a Museum of Maya Culture as well as a zoo, the Payo Obispo Zoo, which belongs to the children of Quintana Roo.

Chetumal's economy has been influenced by its proximity to the border with Belize. A goods and services tax-free zone (Corozal Free Zone) established on the Belizean side attracts many visitors to Chetumal and also provides a ready market for Chetumal's retailers and traders. However, a certain vacuum was created by the lower free zone prices forcing many Chetumal retailers to close their doors. Merchandise bought elsewhere was hard to sell at higher prices than the competition. Chetumal itself was also once a free zone and a notable destination for people from other parts of Mexico seeking to purchase high-value and bulk goods, free of government duty charges (a policy that was deliberately implemented to attract this business). The city retains a significant retail trade for the region, which supports many local businesses.

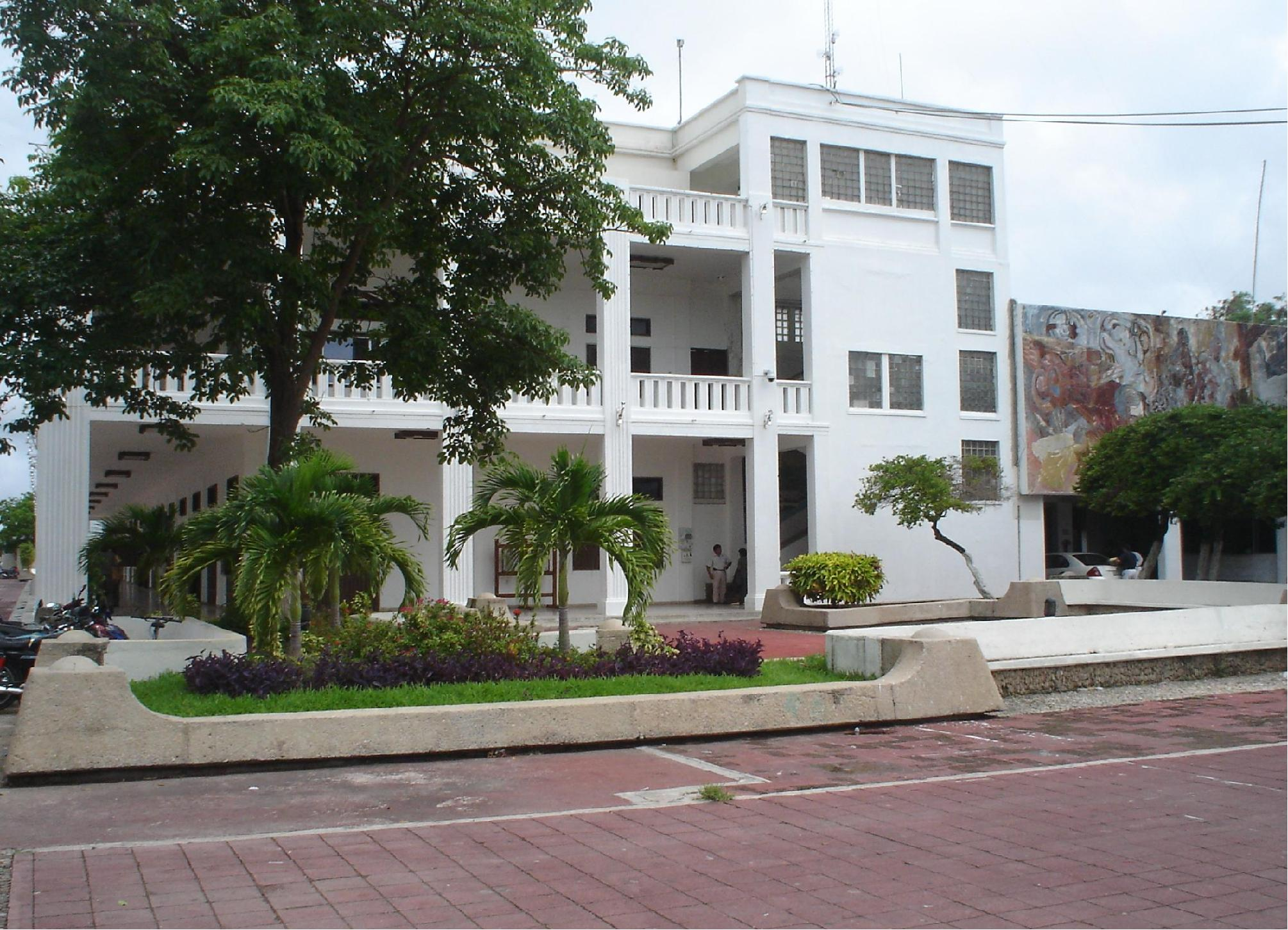
Front of the palace of the Governor of the state of Quintana Roo in Chetumal

A large indoor mall, the Plaza de las Américas, houses a modern movie theater (which belongs to the Mexican chain Cinepolis), various department store chains, fast-food outlets, and a Chedraui supermarket.

In addition to its retail economy, Chetumal is also the capital of the state of Quintana Roo. Since it is the location of all of the state's central offices, there is a large population of government employees whose consumption of local goods and services injects additional revenue into the Chetumal economy. As Capital of the state, Chetumal receives a good share of the foreign currencies brought in by the considerable floating population composed of European, Asian and North American tourists.

The city has a music school which offers lessons of various instruments as well as music theory and history. The school is the main music school of the state and is the home of the Junior symphonic orchestra of the state Quintana Roo ("Orquesta sinfonica juvenil del estado de Quintana Roo") which is directed by Silvia Alcantara Chavero.

The city houses two theaters. The "Teatro Minerva", which is an open-air theater and belongs to the state's music school, and the "Teatro Constituyentes", which is a private-owned theater.

There is a Country club, which features tennis, football and basketball courts, a gym, a swimming pool, a steam-bath and a lounge for parties.

In the early 1990s, the University of Quintana Roo was established at Chetumal, providing training and advanced tertiary degrees over a range of subjects.

== Main sights ==
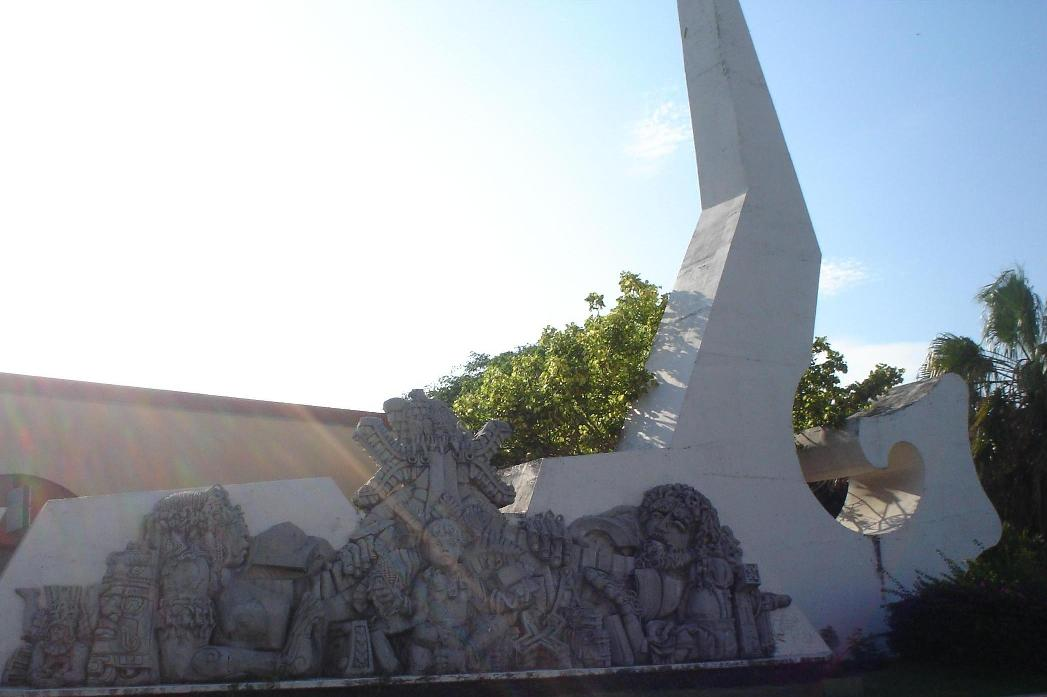
Museum of the Mayan Culture

Chetumal has several museums, monuments and parks.

=== Museums ===
- Cultural Center of the Fine Arts (Centro Cultural de las Bellas Artes), located in the center of the city. The building is housed in what was the school Belisario Domínguez, which was the first school of Quintana Roo.
- Museum of the Mayan Culture (Museo de la Cultura Maya), considered the largest and most comprehensive museum in the state dedicated to the Mayan culture. It has an important collection of authentic and reproductions of classical works, and tells the development of Mayan culture, its origins, as well as various aspects of their daily life.

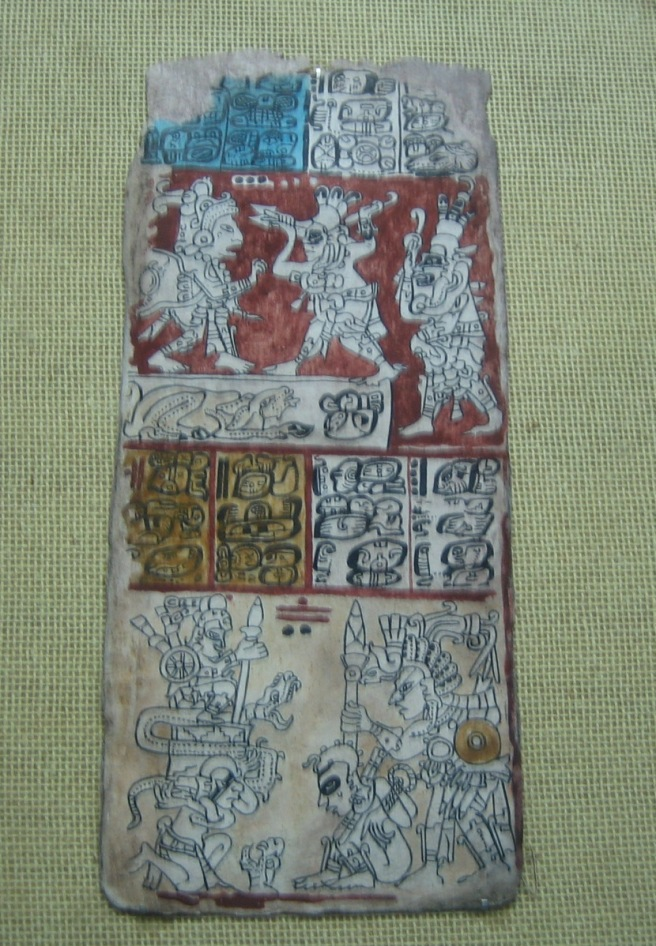
Displayed copy of the Maya Codice in Chetumal, since 2006

- Museum of the city. Tied to the Cultural Center of the Fine Arts, dedicated to the exhibition of photographs, tools and documents that tell the story of the founding of the city.

=== Monuments ===
- Monument to the Flag (Monumento a la Bandera), the first monument built in Chetumal. It consists of a white obelisk that has a clock dial on each of its faces.
- Cradles of the Meztizaje (Monumento Cuna del Meztizaje), constructed in the entrance of Chetumal. It has the form of a Mayan pyramid on which are the statues of Gonzalo Guerrero, his wife Zazil Há and the children of both.
- Andrés Quintana Roo Memorial, dedicated to Andrés Quintana Roo, whom the state was named after.
- Monument to the Fishermen, one of the most recent, located in the Bay of Chetumal.

=== Parks ===
- Ecological Park (Parque Ecológico).
- Cheese Park
- Biouniverzoo Zoo.

== Notable people ==
- Héctor Aguilar Camín
- Wadi Amar Shabshab
- Jorge Bernal Vargas
- Cora Amalia Castilla
- Eduardo Espinosa Abuxapqui
- Héctor Esquiliano Solís
- Luis Fuentes
- Lizbeth Gamboa Song
- Luis García Silva
- Astrid Hadad
- Joaquín Hendricks Díaz
- Raymundo King
- Mayuli Martínez Simón
- Eduardo Ovando Martínez
- María Cristina Sangri Aguilar
- Carlos Sansores
- Dan Stoneking
- Sergio Thompson
- Carolina Valencia
- Lilián Villanueva
- Mario Villanueva
