= Congress of Quintana Roo =

Legislature of Quintana Roo, Mexico

Congress of Quintana Roo Congreso de Quintana Roo
- XVIII Legislatura de Quintana Roo

Type
- Type: Unicameral

Leadership
- Presidente: Dip. Fredy Efrén Marrufo Martín (PRI)
- Vicepresidente: Dip. Jacqueline Estrada Peña (PRD)
- Secretario: Dip. José de la Peña Ruiz de Chavez (PVE)
- Prosecretario: Dip. Baltazar Tuyub Castillo (PNA)

Structure
- Seats: 25 Diputados
- Political groups: Government (21): Morena (13); PVEM (5); PT (3); Opposition (4): PAN (2); PRI (1); MC (1)

Elections
- Last election: 2019-06-02

Meeting place
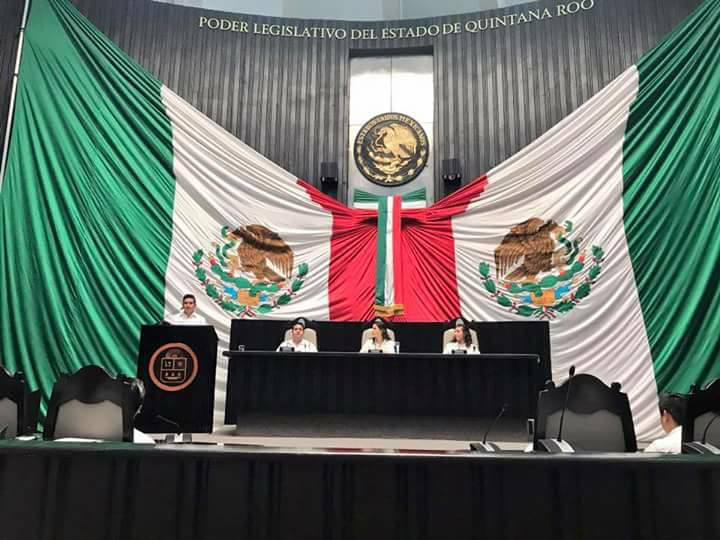
- Palacio Legislativo; 121 del Boulevard Bahí; Chetumal, Quintana Roo

Website
- Sitio Oficial del Poder Legislativo del Estado de Quintana Roo

The Honorable Congress of the Free and Sovereign State of Quintana Roo (Spanish: Honorable Congreso del Estado Libre y Soberano de Quintana Roo), or simply Congress of the State of Quintana Roo (Yucatec Maya: u Noj Mola’ayil u Péetlu’umil Quintana Roo), is the legislature of Quintana Roo, a state of Mexico. The Congress is unicameral.

== See also ==
- List of Mexican state congresses
