= Same-sex marriage in Nayarit =

Same-sex marriage has been legal in Nayarit since 23 December 2015. A bill for the legalization of same-sex marriages was approved by the state Congress on 17 December in a 26–1 vote with 1 abstention. The law was published in the official state journal on 22 December and took effect the following day. Nayarit was the fourth Mexican state to legalise same-sex marriage after Quintana Roo, Coahuila and Chihuahua.

== Legal history ==
=== Background ===
In July 2014, a male couple was allowed to hold Nayarit's first same-sex wedding after a federal judge ruled that the state's same-sex marriage ban was unconstitutional. The couple married in the state capital of Tepic. Also that same month, four lesbian couples filed an amparo against civil registry officials in Tepic after their application for marriage licenses had been rejected. On 31 October 2014, the LGBT group Asociación Civil de CODISE announced that nine couples were awaiting decisions on amparos in the courts. On 3 November 2014, a lesbian couple were married in Tepic (the second same-sex marriage in the state), and on 13 November the state's third same-sex marriage was held for a lesbian couple, who had been granted an amparo to marry on 22 October.

The fourth same-sex marriage in Nayarit took place in the second week of December 2014, making it the third lesbian union in the state. On 27 January 2015, the fifth same-sex marriage occurred in Tepic between two women. It was the first marriage in which the amparo had been approved by local authorities rather than the federal district courts.

=== Legislative action ===
On 13 March 2015, activists introduced a proposal to legalise same-sex marriage to the Congress of Nayarit.

On 25 June 2015, Deputy Luis Manuel Hernández Escobedo from the Party of the Democratic Revolution (PRD) introduced a new bill to allow same-sex couples to marry and make the definition of concubinage gender-neutral. On 17 December 2015, Congress approved the bill 26–1 with 1 abstention. The bill was published in the official state journal on 22 December, following Governor Roberto Sandoval Castañeda's signature, and took effect the following day. The law ensures that married same-sex couples enjoy the same rights, benefits and responsibilities as married opposite-sex couples, including tax benefits, immigration rights, property rights, inheritance, etc., but notably excluding adoption rights.

Article 135 of the Nayarit Civil Code now reads as follows:

- in Spanish: El matrimonio es un contrato civil, por el cual dos personas, se unen en sociedad para realizar vida en común, procurando entre ambos respeto, igualdad y ayuda mutua.
- (Marriage is a civil contract whereby two people unite to establish a community of life, seeking respect, equality and mutual aid.)

Article 136 now reads as follows:

- in Spanish: El concubinato es la unión de hecho entre dos personas, que realizan en forma continua, pública e ininterrumpida una vida en común de manera notoria y permanente, sin que medie vínculo matrimonial entre sí, o con terceras personas.
- (Concubinage is the de facto union between two people, who continuously, publicly and uninterruptedly build a community of life in a clear and permanent way, without establishing a marital bond between themselves or with a third party.)

| Political party | Members | Yes | No | Abstain | Absent |
|---|---|---|---|---|---|
| Institutional Revolutionary Party | 15 | 14 | | | 1 |
| National Action Party | 6 | 4 | | 1 | 1 |
| Party of the Democratic Revolution | 5 | 5 | | | |
| Labor Party | 2 | 2 | | | |
| Ecologist Green Party | 2 | 1 | 1 | | |
| Total | 30 | 26 | 1 | 1 | 2 |

=== Adoption and parental rights ===
The same-sex marriage legislation did not address adoption rights for unmarried or married same-sex couples. In October 2016, a federal judge ruled that the daughter of a married lesbian couple must be registered with the surnames of both her mothers. The judge argued that denying the application for registration of the newborn violated the interests of the child and violated the right to identity (i.e. name, nationality and affiliation). A few days later, the civil registry announced that it would continue to refuse to register children with the surnames of their same-sex parents unless Congress changed the law or if more amparos were granted by the courts. In July 2023, a law went into effect permitting lesbian couples to register their child(ren) with the surnames of both mothers.

It was revealed in May 2018 that 8 same-sex couples were filing adoption applications. According to a 2017 survey by the National Council to Prevent Discrimination, 44% of the Nayarit population supported adoption by same-sex couples. In February 2022, a government official confirmed that same-sex couples are permitted to adopt.

== Marriage statistics ==
The following table shows the number of same-sex marriages performed in Nayarit since legalization in 2015 as reported by the National Institute of Statistics and Geography.

Number of marriages performed in Nayarit
| Year | Same-sex | | | Opposite-sex | Total | % same-sex |
| Year | Female | Male | Total | Opposite-sex | Total | % same-sex |
|---|---|---|---|---|---|---|
| 2015 | 12 | 4 | 16 | 5,607 | 5,623 | 0.28% |
| 2016 | 28 | 21 | 49 | 5,660 | 5,709 | 0.86% |
| 2017 | 37 | 17 | 54 | 5,309 | 5,363 | 1.01% |
| 2018 | 69 | 44 | 113 | 5,352 | 5,465 | 2.07% |
| 2019 | 81 | 37 | 118 | 5,323 | 5,441 | 2.17% |
| 2020 | 54 | 47 | 101 | 3,775 | 3,876 | 2.61% |
| 2021 | 73 | 42 | 115 | 4,663 | 4,778 | 2.41% |

== Public opinion ==
A 2017 opinion poll conducted by Gabinete de Comunicación Estratégica found that 50% of Nayarit residents supported same-sex marriage, while 47% were opposed.

According to a 2018 survey by the National Institute of Statistics and Geography, 39% of the Nayarit public opposed same-sex marriage.

== See also ==
- LGBT rights in Mexico
- Same-sex marriage in Mexico
