= Solferino (disambiguation) =

Solferino is a town in Italy. Solférino is a town in France.

Solferino or Solférino may also refer to:

- Battle of Solferino, final battle of the Second Italian War of Independence
- French ironclad Solférino, Magenta-class ironclad ship built for the French Navy
- Solferino, Quintana Roo, a town in Mexico
- Solférino station, a station on line 12 of the Paris Metro
- Solférino, a suburb of Vacoas-Phoenix, Mauritius
- The Lincoln solferino china service, the porcelain china of Abraham Lincoln's administration in the White House

== See also ==
- Sofrino
