= Same-sex marriage in Chihuahua =

LGBTQ rights in Mexico

Same-sex marriage has been legal in Chihuahua since 12 June 2015. By statute, in Mexico, if any five rulings from the courts on a single issue result in the same outcome, legislatures are bound to change the law. In the case of Chihuahua, more than 20 individual amparos were decided with the same outcome, yet the Congress did not act. In anticipation of the Supreme Court of Justice of the Nation ordering the Congress to act, Governor César Duarte Jáquez announced on 11 June that there would be no further prohibition in the state. Marriage licenses became available the following day, 12 June 2015. Chihuahua was the third Mexican state to legalize same-sex marriage, after Quintana Roo and Coahuila. The gubernatorial policy was continued by María Eugenia Campos Galván in 2021.

== Legal history ==
=== Background ===
On 30 April 2013, a same-sex couple applied for a marriage license in Chihuahua City. The civil registry rejected their request, arguing that the Civil Code defined marriage as the "union of a man and a woman", and thus it could not issue a license to a same-sex couple. The couple filed suit on 7 May 2013, and on 19 August Judge José Juan Múzquiz Gómez of the Tenth District Court of Chihuahua ruled that the couple had the right to marry. The civil registry had until 3 September to appeal the decision. It did not appeal and allowed the deadline to pass, thereby permitting the couple to marry. On 31 October 2013, a lesbian couple was awarded an amparo by the Seventh District Court, and they married in Juárez Municipality in February 2014. On 22 November 2013, Judge Ignacio Cuenca Zamora of the Eighth District Court granted a third amparo to a lesbian couple. In December 2013, a fourth couple, Eduardo Piñón and Julio Salázar, were granted an amparo. They married on 13 February 2014, making them the first two men to marry in Ciudad Juárez. In February 2014, a fifth amparo was granted to Hiram González, president of a local LGBTQ group known as CHEROS (Centro Humanístico de Estudios Relacionados con la Orientación Sexual).

On 19 March 2014, seven lesbian couples were denied marriage licenses in Ciudad Juárez. The civil registrar, Iván Peña Zapién, said it would have been his "pleasure" to issue the licenses, but the law at the time forbade him from issuing licenses to same-sex couples. He encouraged the couples to file an amparo, which they later did. On 30 June 2014, 26 additional couples filed an amparo seeking the right to marry. By July 2014, 33 amparos had been filed in the state; 22 in Chihuahua City and 11 in Ciudad Juárez, and of these, nine had been granted by the courts, while the remaining were awaiting decisions from judges. 2 more same-sex marriages were performed in August 2014. On 13 December 2014, four lesbian couples were married in a mass wedding ceremony in Ciudad Juárez after having successfully received amparos from the courts. This brought the number of same-sex marriages in the state to 14 for 2014. By February 2015, 25 amparos for same-sex marriage rights had been granted in the state. The recurso de amparo remedy only allowed the couples who filed the amparo to marry. It did not legalize same-sex marriage in Chihuahua, as same-sex couples who wished to marry were forced to use this remedy and appear in court before being granted the right to marry.

=== Legislative action and Supreme Court ruling ===
In December 2012, lawmakers were presented with a proposal to amend articles 134 and 135 of the Civil Code of Chihuahua to legalize same-sex marriage. After years with no legislative action, the National Action Party (PAN) announced in July 2014 that they would consider approving civil unions, but not same-sex marriage. LGBT groups opposed civil unions because they would provide same-sex couples with less rights than married spouses. Frustrated with the delay and legislative inaction, 3 LGBT organizations filed an amparo seeking to have the articles of the Civil Code prohibiting same-sex marriage declared unconstitutional and forcing Congress to legalize same-sex marriage. The organizations challenged articles 134 and 135, which defined marriage as the "union of a man and a woman" and characterized marriage as an institution whose purpose was "perpetuating the species". A judge ruled in favor of the plaintiffs on 13 November 2014, declared the articles unconstitutional, and ordered Congress to legalize same-sex marriage. In early February 2015, Judge Cuenca Zamora ruled that the state had an obligation to abide by the findings of the injunction.

On 12 June 2015, the Supreme Court of Justice of the Nation ruled that state bans on same-sex marriage are unconstitutional nationwide. The court's ruling is considered a "jurisprudential thesis" and did not invalidate state laws, meaning that same-sex couples denied the right to marry would still have to seek individual amparos in court. The ruling standardized the procedures for judges and courts throughout Mexico to approve all applications for same-sex marriages and made the approval mandatory. The court based its decision on Article 4 of the Constitution of Mexico, which respects matrimonial equality: "Man and woman are equal under the law. The law shall protect the organization and development of the family". (Note: In Spanish: El varón y la mujer son iguales ante la ley. Esta protegerá la organización y el desarrollo de la familia. In Tarahumara: 'Échi rejói a'lí mukí anári ká natéa ́mi jú mapu riká aní nulalíwa ́mi. 'échi kó 'á tibúma, natuíka nocháa ́mi kíti kó a'lá kánílika retemáka perélima. In Tepehuán: Go kïrhi dhi go óki mos jïmádogami maaxi bho sïrhikamiana ley. ídhi soikïdamo dana kïïga kaburhi úrrabakagi dhi dana gïrhidhagi go kiïkamiïrrï obhakami.) Soon after the Supreme Court ruling, Deputy María Eugenia Campos Galván (PAN) introduced a bill to Congress to limit marriage to "one man and one woman for the purpose of procreation". Her proposal was supported by the PAN block of legislators, but was unsuccessful.

On 9 March 2017, Deputy Crystal Tovar Aragóna from the Party of the Democratic Revolution (PRD) introduced a bill to repeal articles 134 and 135. After two years of legislative inaction, Deputy Lourdes Valle Armendáriz from the National Regeneration Movement introduced a new same-sex marriage bill in May 2019. Both bills stalled and were not voted on.

In February 2017, the Mexican Supreme Court ruled that the refusal of Congress to amend the Chihuahua Civil Code was unconstitutional, and ordered Congress to pass legislation codifying same-sex marriage within 90 days. Following the ruling, several conservative lawmakers said they would defy the court ruling. A PAN deputy claimed erroneously that the Supreme Court could not force the state to change its Civil Code, and the Social Encounter Party (PES) said they would sue the state for allowing same-sex couples to marry. Governor Javier Corral Jurado called for same-sex marriage to be discussed in Congress. In late March, the Civil Registry of Chihuahua modified the marriage license forms, replacing the terms "groom's name" and "bride's name" with "names of the contracting parties", thus also applying to same-sex couples. Changes to birth certificates were also made. These changes caused an uproar within conservative groups. In April 2017, Governor Corral Jurado issued an executive order reinstating the terms "mother" and "father" on birth certificates. Even though the Supreme Court had ordered Congress to change the Civil Code within 90 days, by December 2017 it had still not been modified to comply with the Mexican Constitution by removing the heterosexual definition of marriage. In October 2018, the Tenth District Court of Chihuahua ruled that should the Congress fail to amend its Civil Code "soon", it would hold legislators in contempt of court and order their dismissal from office, but the Civil Code still remained unchanged in 2022.

=== Gubernatorial decree (2015) ===
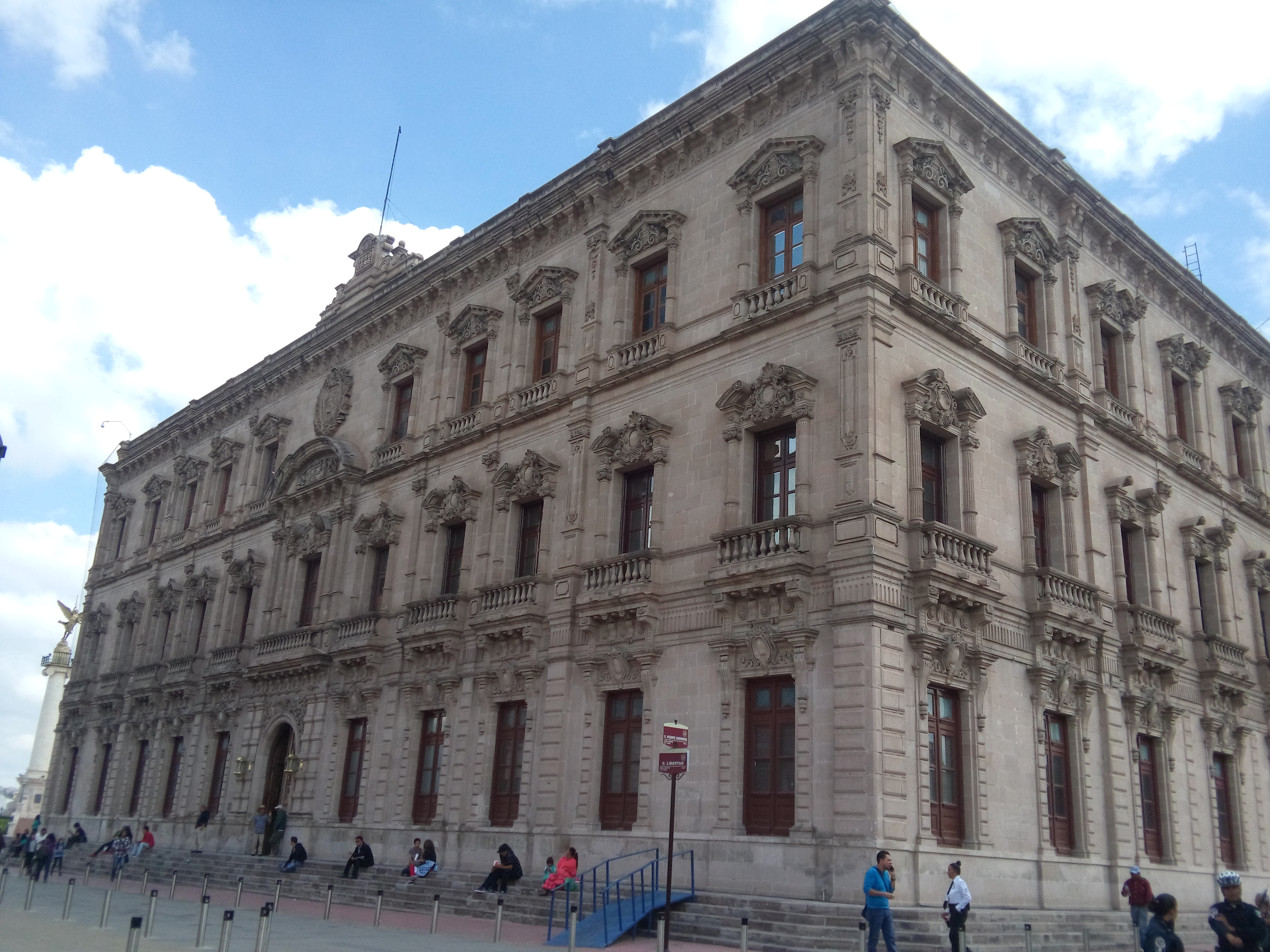
The Government Palace of Chihuahua (Spanish: Palacio de Gobierno de Chihuahua), the seat of the state executive power

On 11 June 2015, Governor César Duarte Jáquez issued a decree stating that the state would no longer prohibit same-sex marriages. Duarte Jáquez announced that marriage licenses would be available beginning on 12 June, making Chihuahua the fourth jurisdiction in Mexico to legalize same-sex marriage, after Mexico City, Quintana Roo, and Coahuila. Conservative groups condemned Duarte Jáquez's decree, and in September 2016 lawmakers opposed to same-sex marriage attempted unsuccessfully to pass legislation to nullify the decree. The decree ensures that married same-sex couples enjoy the same rights, benefits and responsibilities as married opposite-sex couples, including tax benefits, immigration rights, property rights, inheritance, etc. Married couples are also permitted to adopt regardless of sexual orientation. By June 2016, five same-sex couples had petitioned to adopt.

In April 2017, multiple Mexican media outlets reported that Governor Javier Corral Jurado had issued a new decree banning same-sex marriage in Chihuahua. A few days later, when asked to comment, Governor Corral Jurado denied having issued a decree banning same-sex marriage. He affirmed that same-sex couples are allowed to marry in Chihuahua without their needing to file an amparo. Corral Jurado also stated he had personally married 30 same-sex couples in Delicias, Ciudad Cuauhémoc and Ciudad Juárez since his election as governor in 2016.

== Marriage statistics ==
The following table shows the number of same-sex marriages performed in Chihuahua since legalization in 2015 as reported by the National Institute of Statistics and Geography. Figures for 2020 are much lower than previous years because of the restrictions in place due to the COVID-19 pandemic.

Number of marriages performed in Chihuahua
Year	Same-sex			Opposite-sex	Total	% same-sex
Year	Female	Male	Total	Opposite-sex	Total	% same-sex
2015	44	23	67	20,083	20,150	0.33%
2016	61	42	103	19,058	19,161	0.54%
2017	98	66	164	15,825	15,989	1.03%
2018	114	78	192	15,595	15,787	1.22%
2019	163	79	242	16,346	16,588	1.46%
2020	81	43	124	10,704	10,828	1.15%
2021	179	101	280	16,566	16,846	1.66%

The first same-sex marriage for a Rarámuri same-sex couple was performed in January 2022. The couple, Carlos Eduardo Lara González and Rogelio Aguirre López, said, "We had lived together for three years, with this we seek to motivate that love is universal. They can be a man and a man, a woman and a woman, it is the same simply to close the discrimination gap."

== Public opinion ==
A 2017 opinion poll conducted by Gabinete de Comunicación Estratégica found that 45% of Chihuahua residents supported same-sex marriage, while 52.5% were opposed.

According to a 2018 survey by the National Institute of Statistics and Geography, 36% of the Chihuahua public opposed same-sex marriage.

== See also ==
- Same-sex marriage in Mexico
- LGBT rights in Mexico
