= Mesoamerican Gulf–Caribbean mangroves =

Ecoregion in Central America

Mesoamerican Gulf-Caribbean mangroves
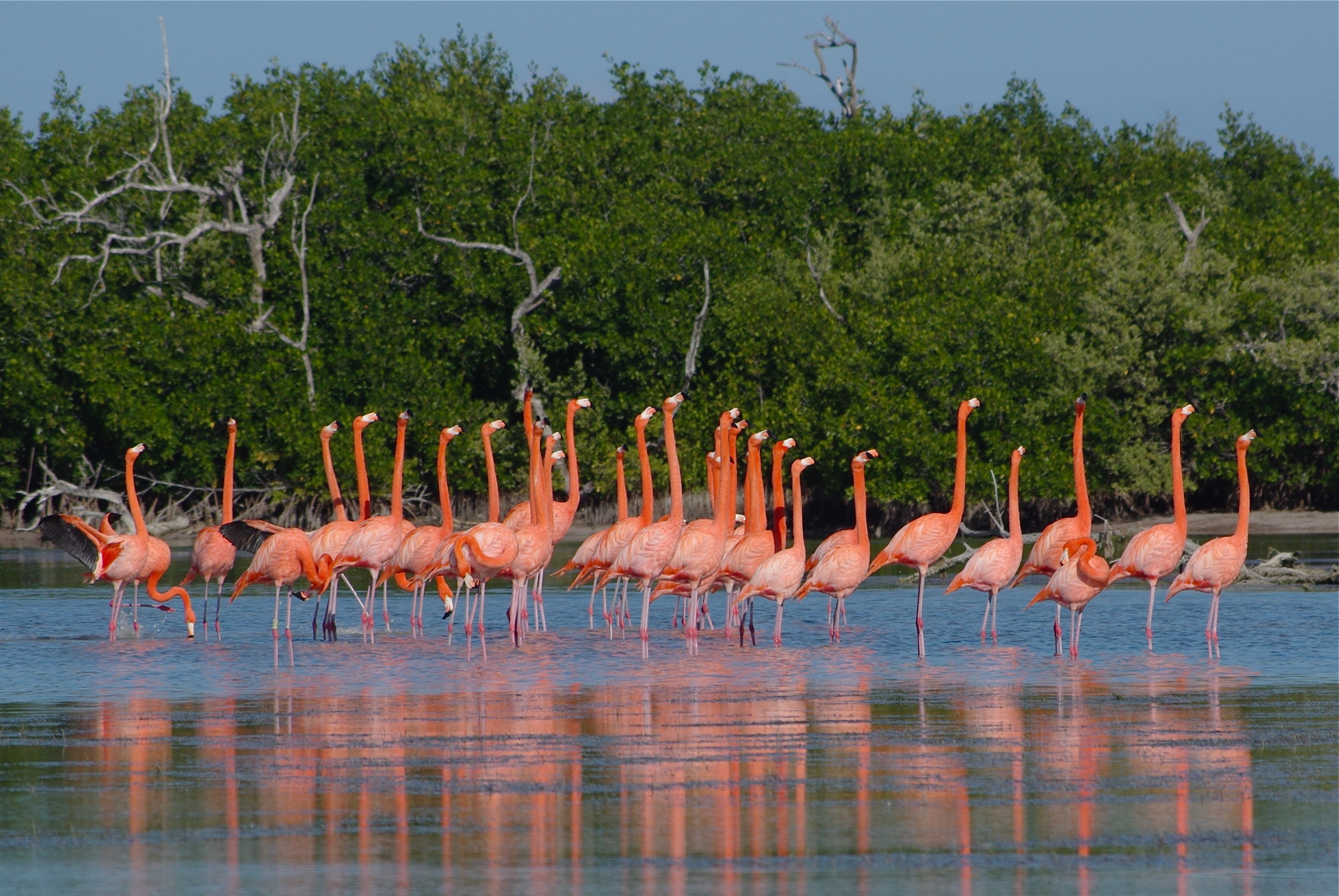
- Flamingoes at Ría Lagartos Biosphere Reserve

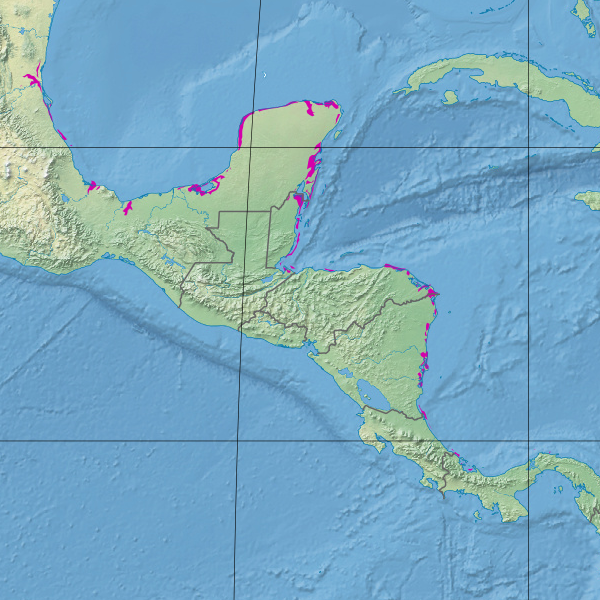
- Ecoregion territory (in purple)

Ecology
- Realm: Neotropic realm
- Biome: Mangroves

Geography
- Area: 26,803 km^{2} (10,349 sq mi)
- Country: Mexico, Belize, Guatemala, Honduras, Nicaragua, Costa Rica, Panama
- Coordinates: 18°N 88°W

The Mesoamerican Gulf-Caribbean mangroves ecoregion (WWF ID: NT1403) covers the series of disconnected mangrove habitats along the eastern coast of Central America. These salt-water wetlands are found in river deltas, lagoons, and low-lying areas facing the Gulf of Mexico and Caribbean Sea, from Tampico, Mexico to central Panama. The mangroves are areas of high biodiversity and endemism. Many of the sites are protected as national parks or nature reserves (over half of the total land area).

== Location and description ==
The ecoregion's northernmost site is at Tampico in the Mexican state of Tamaulipas, where the Pánuco River meets the Gulf of Mexico. It covers most of the coastal areas south through Mexico, Belize, Guatemala, Honduras, Nicaragua, Costa Rica, and Panama, with the southernmost site at the Gulf of Guna Yala in Panama. This stretches 2,500 km, from 22.2 degrees latitude in the north to 9.5 degrees latitude in the south.

River Deltas. Many of these mangroves are found in the outlets of major rivers: the Pánuco River, Papaloapan River, and Coatzacoalcos River in Mexico, and the Coco River on the border of Honduras and Nicaragua.

Lagoons. Lagoons tend to be inlets of the sea. Major ones in the ecoregion are in Mexico (Tamiahua Lagoon, Laguna de Términos, the lagoon at Yum Balam; in Nicaragua Pearl Lagoon, and in Panama Chiriquí Lagoon.

Islands. Examples include Isla Contoy and Isla Mujeres off the northeast point of the Yucatan Peninsula; and Turneffe Atoll off Belize.

== Climate ==
The climate of the is Tropical savanna climate - dry winter (Köppen climate classification (Aw)). This climate is characterized by relatively even temperatures throughout the year, and a pronounced dry season. The driest month has less than 60 mm of precipitation, and is drier than the average month.

== Flora and fauna ==
The common mangrove tree species of the ecoregion are white mangrove (Laguncularia racemosa; generally closest to the ocean), red mangrove (Rhizophora mangle), and black mangrove (Avicennia germinans) (farther inland or upland). Other characteristic vegetation includes are (Pterocarpus officinalis), provision tree (Pachira aquatica) and swamp fern (Acrostichum aureum).

Mammals include Mexican agouti (Dasyprocta mexicana), Mexican black howler monkey (Alouatta pigra), Baird's tapir (Tapirus bairdii), Central American spider monkey (Ateles geoffroyi), Giant anteater (Myrmecophaga tridactyla), Deppe's squirrel (Sciurus deppei). Reptiles include green turtle (Chelonia mydas), hawksbill sea turtle (Eretmochelys imbricata), Central American river turtle (Dermatemys mawii), and Morelets crocodile (Crocodylus moreletii).

== Protected areas ==
57% of the collective areas of these mangroves are protected in some official capacity. Protected areas include:

- Tortuguero National Park, in Limón Province, Costa Rica
- Ría Lagartos Biosphere Reserve, on the northern coast of the Yucatan Peninsula of Mexico
- Yum Balam Flora and Fauna Protection Area, on the northern coast of the Yucatan Peninsula of Mexico
- Ría Celestun Biosphere Reserve, in the state of Campeche, Mexico
- Sian Ka'an Biosphere Reserve, in the Mexican state of Quintana Roo
- Arrecifes de Xcalak National Park, in the state of Quintana Roo, Mexico
- Payne's Creek National Park, in Toledo District in Belize
- Sarstoon-Temash National Park, on the southern border of Belize
- Río Plátano Biosphere Reserve, the La Mosquitia region of Honduras
- Rio Kruta National Park, in Gracias a Dios Department, Honduras.
- Punta de Manabique, on the east coast of Guatemaula
- Miskito Cays Biological Reserve, an offshore archipelago northeast of Nicaragua
