= Solferino, Quintana Roo =

Solferino
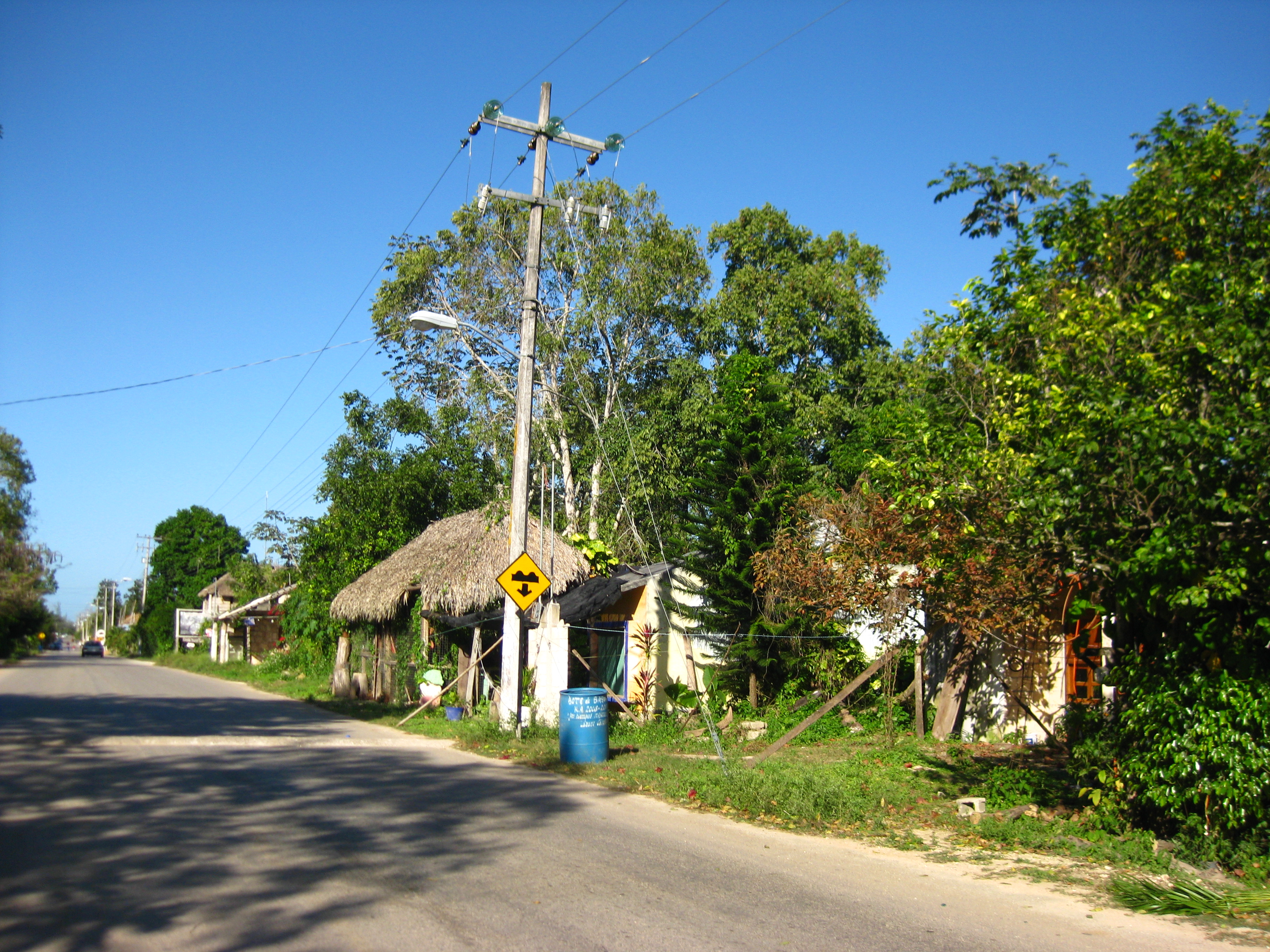

- Location within Mexico
- Coordinates: 21°21′08″N 87°25′44″W
- Country: Mexico
- State: Quintana Roo
- Municipality: Lázaro Cárdenas

Government
  - Mayor: Roberto Antonio Lara Caamal
- Elevation: 10 m (33 ft)

Population
  - Total: 799
- Time zone: UTC-5 (Eastern Time Zone)
- Postal code: 77330
- Area code: 984

Solferino is a small town located in the municipality of Lázaro Cárdenas in the state of Quintana Roo, Mexico.

The town is located at an altitude of 10 meters above sea level and has a population of 799 inhabitants, according to the 2010 census conducted by INEGI. The population is located 13 kilometers from the port of Chiquilá and close to the western limit of the Yum Balam Protection Area of Flora and Fauna, a national protected reserve with an area of 155,000ha which includes valuable wetlands. It is part of the ecological province of Yucatán in the biogeographical region of Yalahau.

This area contains a lush jungle. According to the classification of vegetation published by Jerzy Rzedowski, the north of the town is composed of aquatic and sub-aquatic vegetation and wetlands including brackish lagoons and coastal marshes with plenty of red mangrove and seagrass. In the town's common ground the lowland evergreen jungle consists of semi-deciduous trees, abundant Chacah, Ramón, Lysiloma latisiliquum, Paurotis palm and logwood. These separated groups of trees are known locally as "ramonales", "zapotal tintales", "tazistales" and "tulares".

Within the population of 799 inhabitants, 408 are male and 391 are female. Most of this population is indigenous, the dominant being Mayan with 15% of them speaking Spanish as well as the Maya language meanwhile 85% speaks Spanish only. There is also ethnic minority Tuxpeno population which were brought over from Veracruz State when the region was colonized in the late nineteenth century. This coincided with the exploitation of logwood, the gum and precious woods.

This ecosystem is home to several species including, deer, badgers, pigs, foxes, racoons, pacas, turtles and boas, pit vipers, brush turkeys and pheasants, as well as an abundance of endemic and migratory songbirds. Because of its proximity to the coast of Isle of Holbox and its abundance of wetlands, waterfowl such as herons, pelicans, frigatebirds and occasionally ducks, flamingos, and cormorants can be seen.

== History ==
According to information collected by historians from the inhabitants of Solferino, it is known that the previous name of the village was Labcáh which in Mayan language means old village. It was in the jurisdiction of the ancient Maya province or chiefdom of Ekab, which was called The Great Cairo by the Spanish because of the intense maritime movement observed by the Mayans.

According to another version, the town changed its name to Solferino as a result of the Urcelay family, landowners who were responsible for the exploitation of logwood. This family are said to have piled large quantities of logs in the village center. When it rained, the dye from the trunks stained the village a reddish color, known as magenta - 'solferino' by people Spanish speaking. The town has been known this way ever since.
