= Chiquilá =

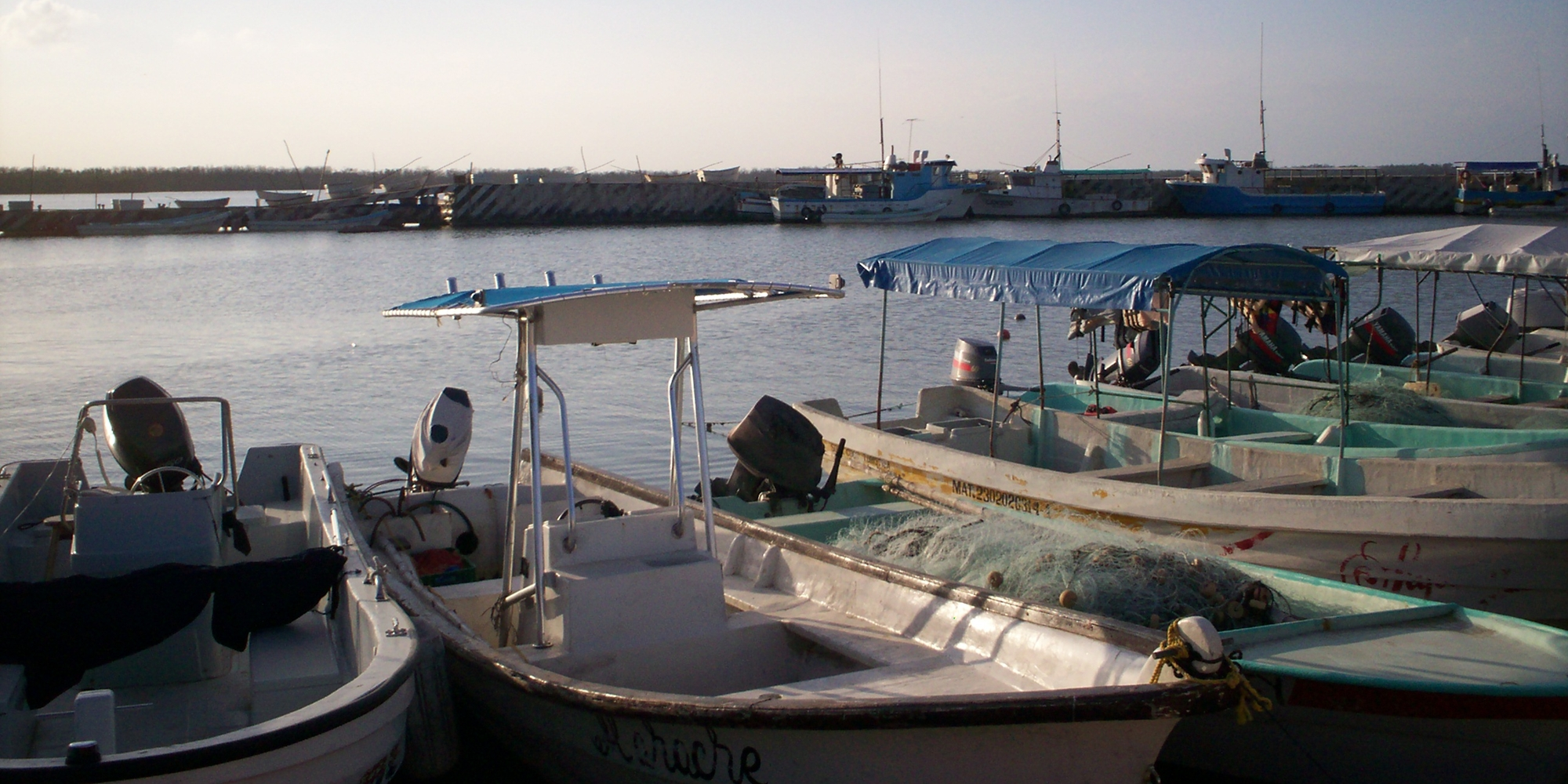

- Location within Quintana Roo
- Coordinates: 21°25′47″N 87°20′12″W
- Country: Mexico
- State: Quintana Roo
- Municipality: Lázaro Cárdenas
- Elevation: 5 m (16 ft)

Population (2020)
  - Total: 2,311
- Time zone: UTC-5 (Eastern Time Zone)
- Postal code: 77320
- Area code: 984

Chiquilá is a pueblo (village) located in the municipality of Lázaro Cárdenas in the state of Quintana Roo, Mexico, in the extreme northeast of the Yucatán Peninsula. It is located on the coast of the Gulf of Mexico, and its location allows it to be the maritime link to Isla Holbox, an island with a significant tourist influx.

== History ==
The Maya town of Conil was situated in what is now the town of Chiquilá, until it was abandoned in the middle of the 17th century. In 1528, Francisco de Montejo visited the town and reported that there were 5,000 houses. Archaeological efforts in the mid-2010s reveal that Conil was one of the largest coastal settlements along the north coast of the Yucatán during the Late and Terminal Pre-classic periods, and once again during the Late Postclassic period.

In the late 19th century, businesses started promoting development in the northern region of the peninsula. Their goal was to grow agricultural production and increase logging activities. This expansion led to the creation of haciendas and communities in the area, including Chiquilá.
