= Nuevo Durango =

Coordinates: 20°43′19″N 87°35′02″W

Nuevo Durango is a small community (population 225 as of 2010) in the extreme southern part of the municipality of Lázaro Cárdenas in the Mexican state of Quintana Roo, near the border with Yucatán state. The area contains a number of caves such as Tumben Kuxtal (“new life” in Maya), most of which get discovered accidentally by locals. These locals offer tours to adventurers, including rappelling down into caves with absolutely no infrastructure such as the Cueva de Tepecuintle or the Cueva del Agua Escondida. The latter is a system of tunnels and cavities recommended only for experts. There are also caves which have lighting and other amenities installed.

A common way to cook here is with an underground oven called a “pib” in which both meat and vegetables are prepared.
