= Yum Balam =

Nature reserve in Quintana Roo, Mexico

Área de Protección de Flora y Fauna Yum Balam
- IUCN category VI (protected area with sustainable use of natural resources)
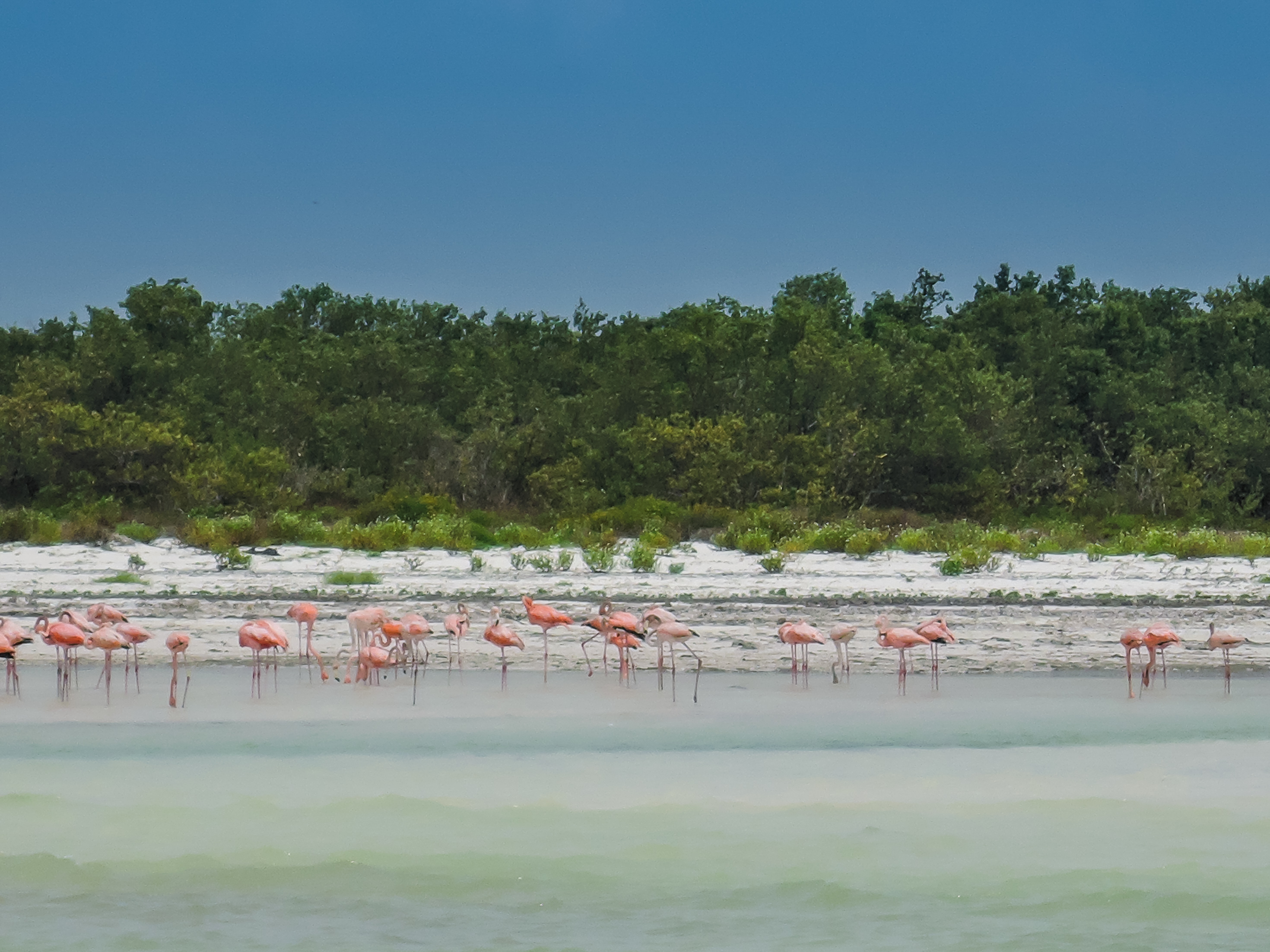
- Flamingos on Isla Holbox

- Location within Mexico Location within Quintana Roo
- Location: Lázaro Cárdenas and Isla Mujeres Municipalities, Quintana Roo, Mexico
- Coordinates: 21°28′N 87°19′W
- Area: 1,540.52 km^{2} (594.80 sq mi)
- Established: 6 June 1994
- Governing body: National Commission of Protected Natural Areas

Ramsar Wetland
- Official name: Área de Protección de Flora y Fauna Yum Balam
- Designated: 2 February 2004
- Reference no.: 1360

Yum Balam Flora and Fauna Protection Area (Spanish: Área de protección de flora y fauna Yum Balam) is a Mexican Flora and Fauna Protection Area located in the state of Quintana Roo in southeastern Mexico. Established in 1994, the nature reserve was the first protected area in Mexico to be created at the request of local communities. The reserve includes wetlands along the north shore of the Yucatán Peninsula and adjacent Isla Holbox and has been designated as a protected Ramsar site since 2004.

== Features ==
Yum Balam Flora and Fauna Protection Area is located near the northeastern tip of the Yucatán Peninsula in Quintana Roo's Lázaro Cárdenas and Isla Mujeres Municipalities, northwest of Cancún and the Riviera Maya. Several communities are located within the reserve, including Chiquilá, Solferino, and Holbox. The area protects a section of coastal wetlands, a string of barrier islands (of which the largest is Isla Holbox), Yalahau Lagoon between the islands and the mainland, and some coastal waters beyond the islands.

The area provides a habitat for jaguars, Baird's tapirs, crocodiles, sea turtles, American manatees, Caribbean spiny lobsters and ocellated turkeys, as well as Everglades palms and mangroves. Migrating whale sharks have become a significant tourist attraction since 2003. At the time of its establishment the reserve hosted large nesting populations of double-crested cormorants, brown pelicans and magnificent frigatebirds, though their nesting grounds were much damaged by Hurricanes Gilbert, Isidore and Wilma.

== History ==
The northern Yucatán Peninsula experienced significant destruction from Hurricane Gilbert in 1988, followed by a drought and severe wildfires in 1989. The environmental damage led locals to form an organization to petition for greater environmental protection from the federal government. The group called itself the Yum Balam Civil Association, using a phrase in the Yucatec Maya language meaning "Lord Jaguar" to refer to a jaguar god of nature.

Discussions between local groups and government agencies led to the establishment of a Yum Balam Flora and Fauna Protection Area under the federal Flora and Fauna Protection Areas program on 6 June 1994, the first time a protected area in Mexico was established at the request of a local community. The reserve was later recognized as a Wetland of International Importance under the Ramsar Convention on 2 February 2004.

=== Management controversies ===
Yum Balam is meant to be managed in cooperation with local communities and permits limited hunting and fishing by locals. In practice, controversy has arisen over whether local communities and organizations have been properly involved in decision-making, with locals and some academics expressing concern in the 2000s that the reserve's development was benefiting outside businesses more than its resident communities.

In 2018 a series of federal inspections led to the temporary closure or cancellation of a number of proposed or partially completed development projects on Isla Holbox that were found to be in violation of the regulations governing the protected area. Later that year, the Official Gazette of the Federation published a development management plan for Yum Balam aimed at ensuring that future tourism development will be compatible with the environmental protection of the region.
