= Isla Holbox =

- Island community
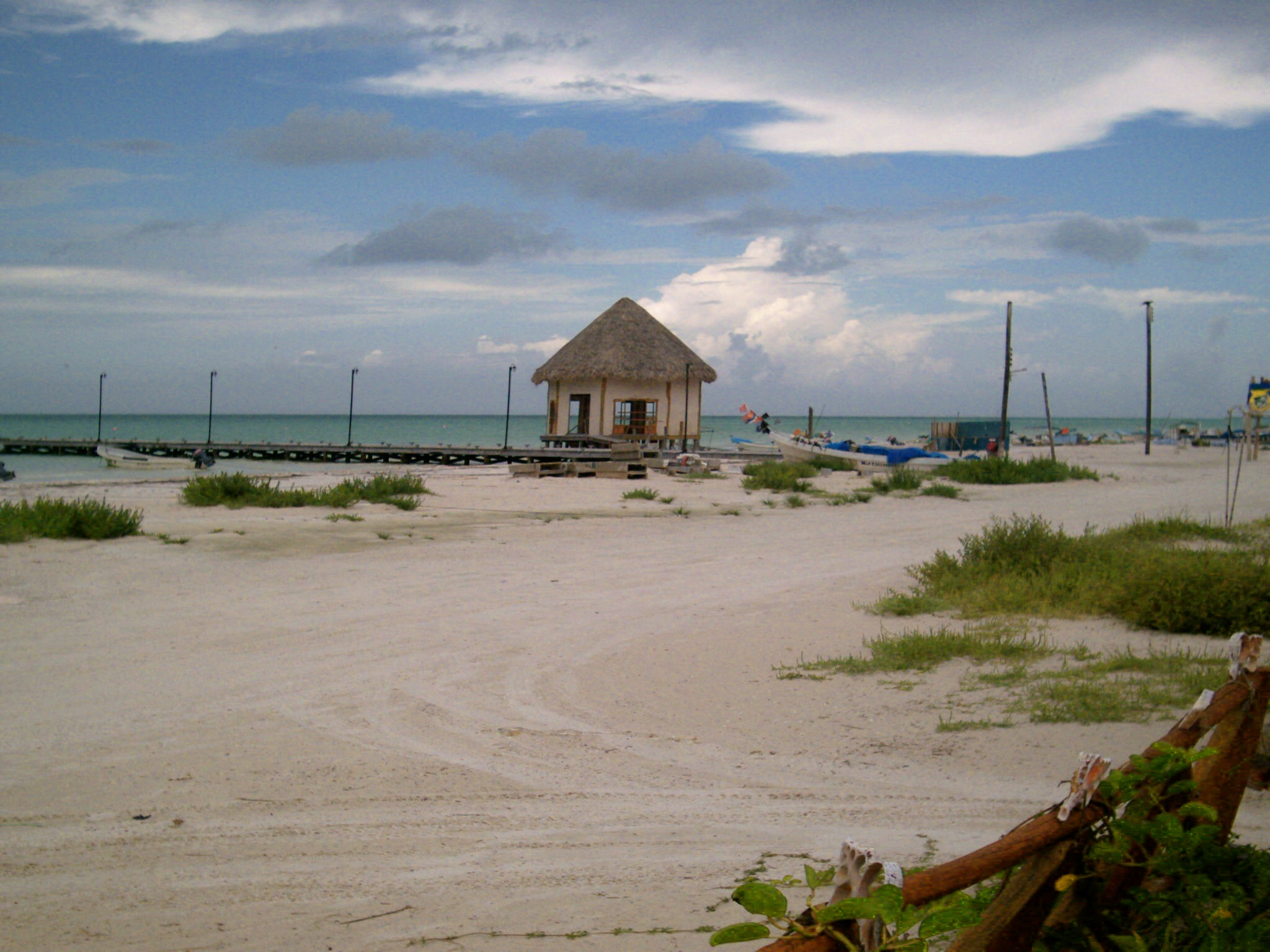
- Isla Holbox in June 2008
- Interactive map of Isla Holbox
- Location within Quintana Roo Location within Mexico Location within Gulf of Mexico
- Coordinates: 21°32′16″N 87°13′12″W
- Country: Mexico
- State: Quintana Roo
- Municipality: Lázaro Cárdenas
- Town Founded: 1854

Area
  - Land: 55.948 km^{2} (21.602 sq mi)
- Elevation: 1 m (3.3 ft)

Population (2005)
  - Total: 1,198
- Demonym: Holboxeños
- Time zone: UTC-5 (Eastern Standard Time)
- Postal code: 77310
- Area code: 984

Holbox (Spanish pronunciation: [xolˈβoʃ], "black hole" in Yucatec Maya) is an island in the Mexican state of Quintana Roo, located on the north coast of the Yucatán Peninsula . It is approximately 41.84 kilometres (26.00 miles) long and 1.5 kilometres (0.9 miles) wide, and it is separated from the mainland by 10 km of shallow lagoon that is home to flamingos, pelicans and other rich birdlife. Holbox Island is part of the Municipality of Lázaro Cárdenas and also part of the Yum Balam Biosphere Reserve.

The island's main industry is fishing. However, the island is developing a growing tourist industry in the form of whale shark viewing. Lobster is the main product of this fishing and many of the dishes made on the island center around lobster or other seafood.

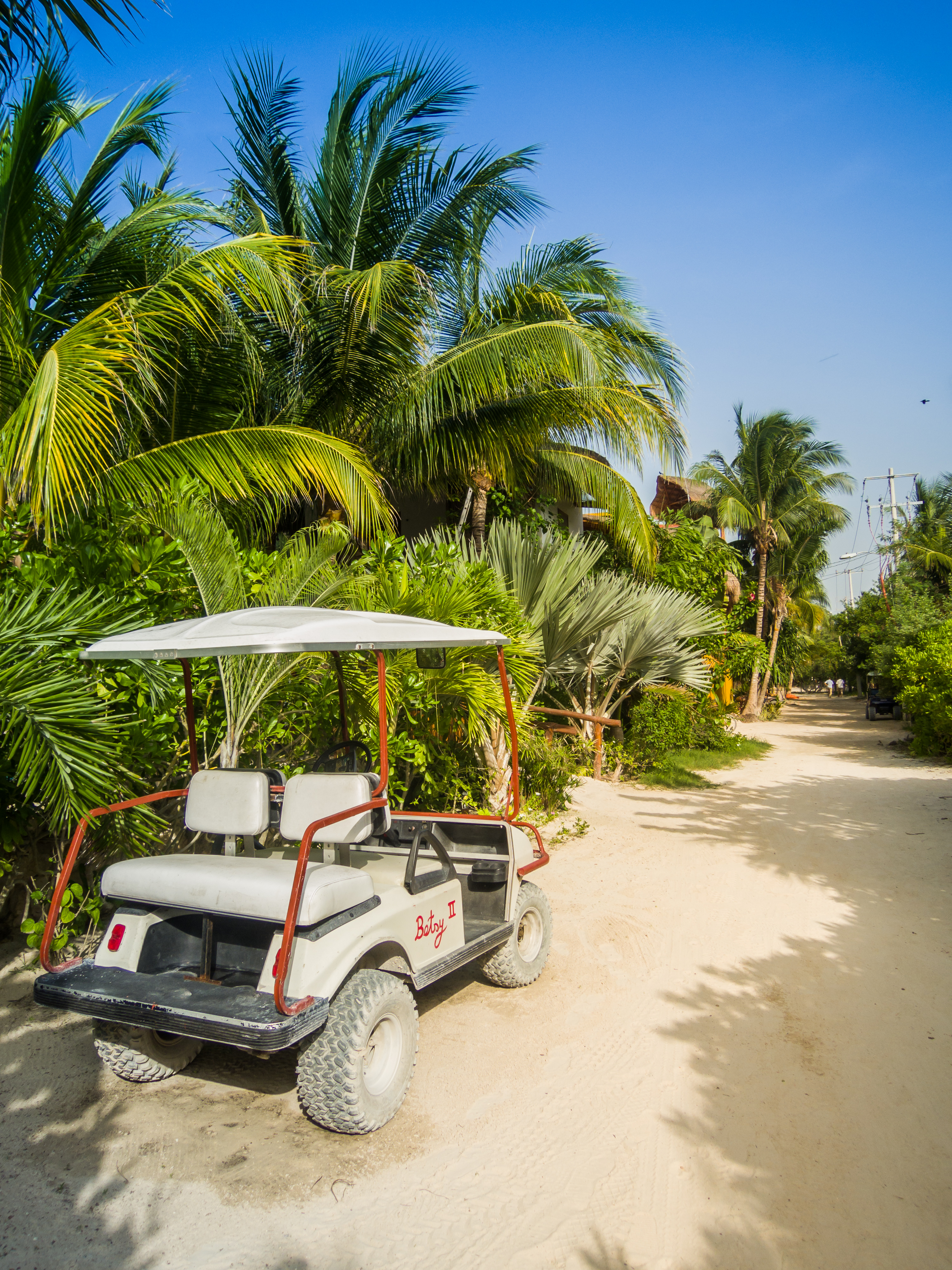
Golfcar Holbox island Mexico

The island is accessed by ferry from the mainland town of Chiquilá, and has virtually no cars, with transport by most residents and tourists by golf cart or moped. A few charter airlines fly to Holbox from Cancún and Playa del Carmen; there is a small airstrip called Holbox Aerodrome that can accommodate five-seater and 13-seater Cessna aircraft.

Vehicle entry is not allowed at Holbox in order to protect the environment and to prevent the streets from accumulating sand.

Holbox has several alternatives to enjoy nature, but the one that attracts most visitors is the experience of swimming with the impressive whale shark from June to September, an opportunity found in very few parts of the world. During hurricane season, the island is often evacuated as it can get directly damaged by hurricane winds.

== History ==
The first written mentions of the island were in 1852 from a document sent by Don Bartolomé Magaña to the Governor of Yucatán. The adjacent mainland was frequently attacked by the Maya therefore people sought refuge on this island. The government wanted to keep people from living on this island but the citizens refused to leave their homes. Hurricanes in 1886 completely destroyed the island, but the island was rebuilt afterward.

Electricity reached the island in 1987. The island was registered ecological reserve (Yum Balam Biosphere Reserve) in 1994.

Starting in the 2000s, a real estate boom changed the island's economy, mainly led by the charm of the remote island. In 2020, El País reported 20 ongoing litigation to dismantle the island's protected status.

== Snorkeling in Holbox ==
Isla Holbox offers seasonal snorkeling opportunities shaped by weather, sea conditions, and marine life migrations. The best general conditions occur during the dry season (November–April), when rainfall is low, winds are lighter, and underwater visibility is more consistent. From mid-May to mid-September, warmer waters attract whale sharks, with peak sightings typically in July and August, although this period overlaps with the rainy and early hurricane season, making sea conditions less predictable. Compared with other Mexican snorkeling destinations, Holbox is characterized more by seasonal megafauna encounters than by extensive coral reefs: Cozumel and Cabo Pulmo provide more consistent year-round reef snorkeling and visibility, while Isla Mujeres combines accessible reefs with a similar summer whale shark season.

== Geography ==
75% of the island is made of wild mangroves and empty beaches.

At the western tip of the island, there is a lagoon called Punta Cocos, where bioluminescence can be observed on dark nights.

Whale sharks season is from June to September. Flamingo season is from April to December.

== Urbanism ==
Holbox is a car-free island. People drive around in golf carts. There are no paved roads on the island. The island's many sandy pathways are not recognized and thus indexed on Google Maps.

Buildings may not be higher than 40 feet.

== Conveniences ==
There is no postal service and no banks on the island. Around 50 restaurants are located on the island (2020), and around 75 hotels.

== Gallery ==
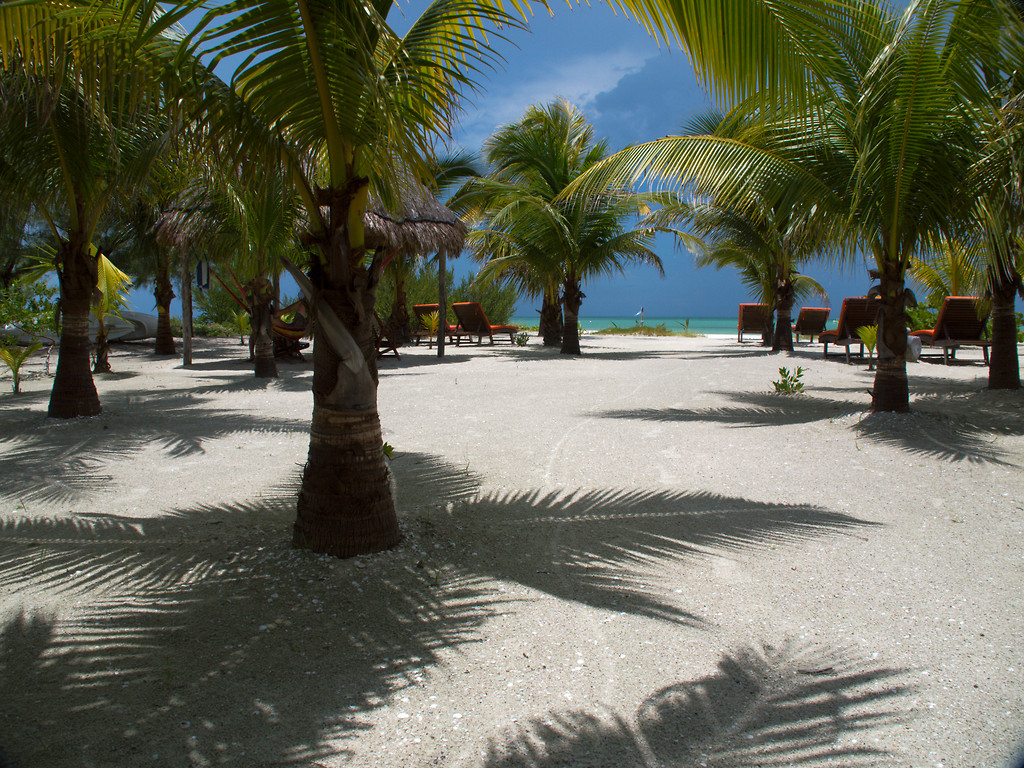
Palms, Beach and the Sea

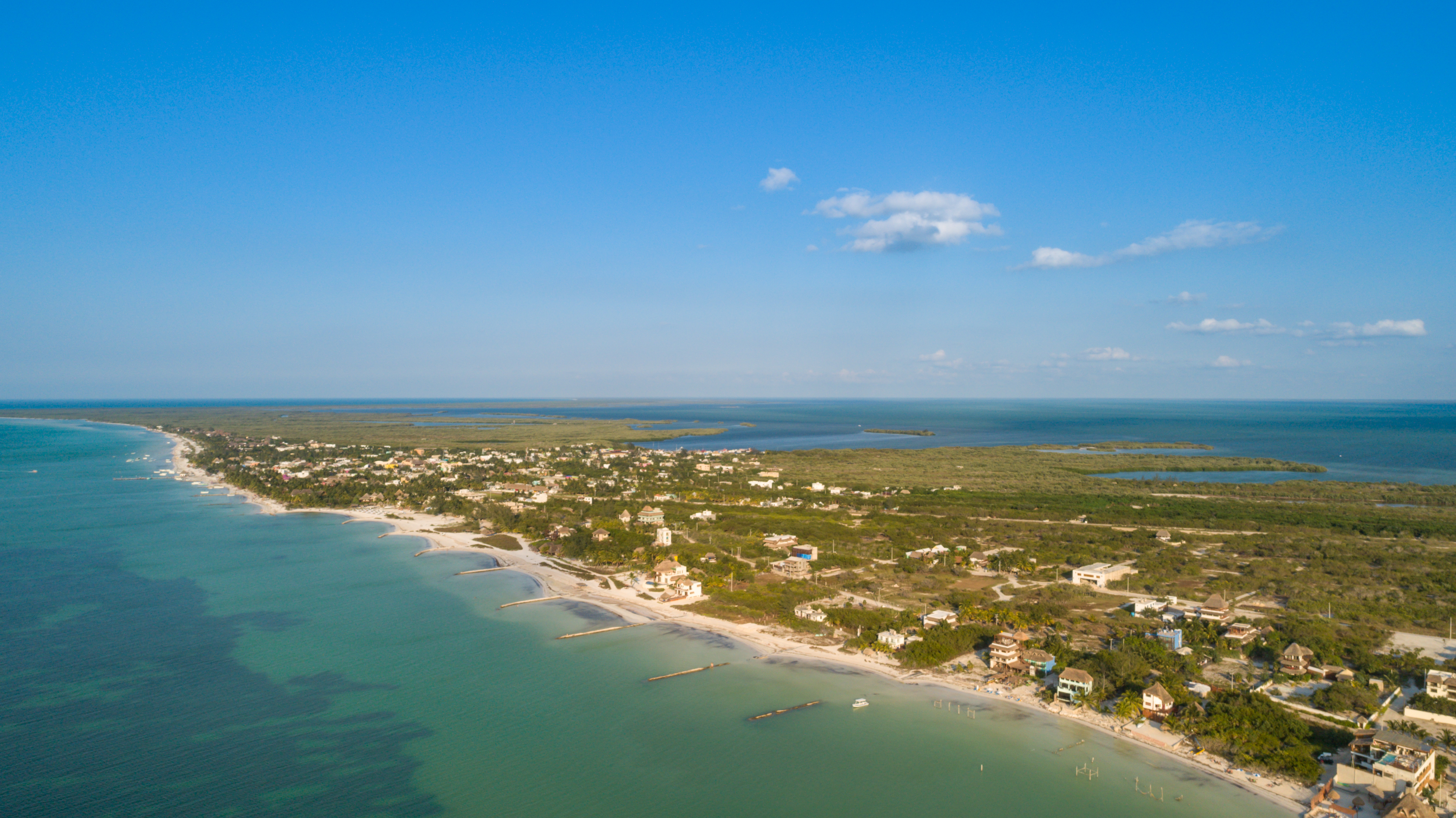
Holbox city aerial

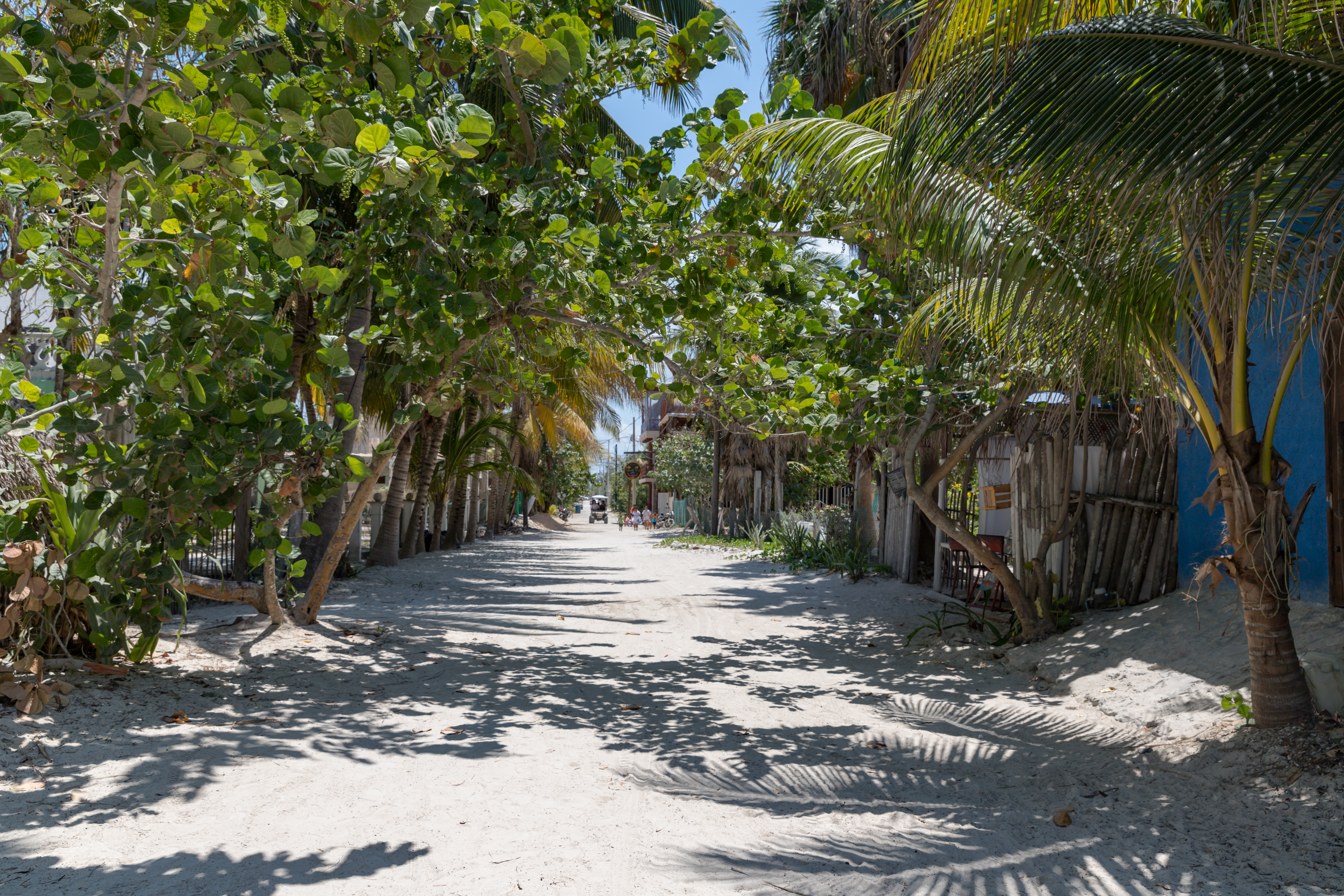
Sandy streets of Holbox

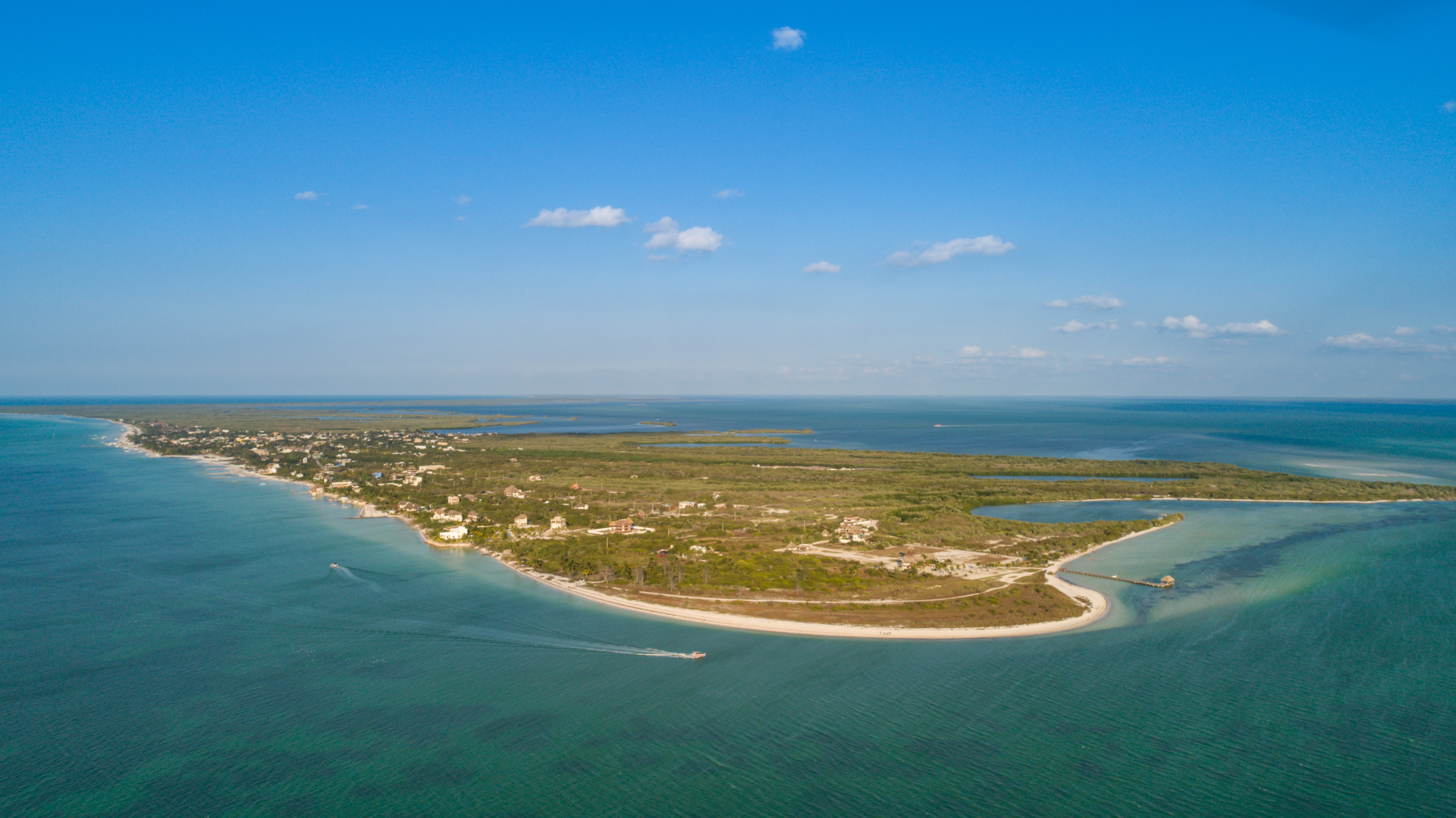
Aerial view of Holbox

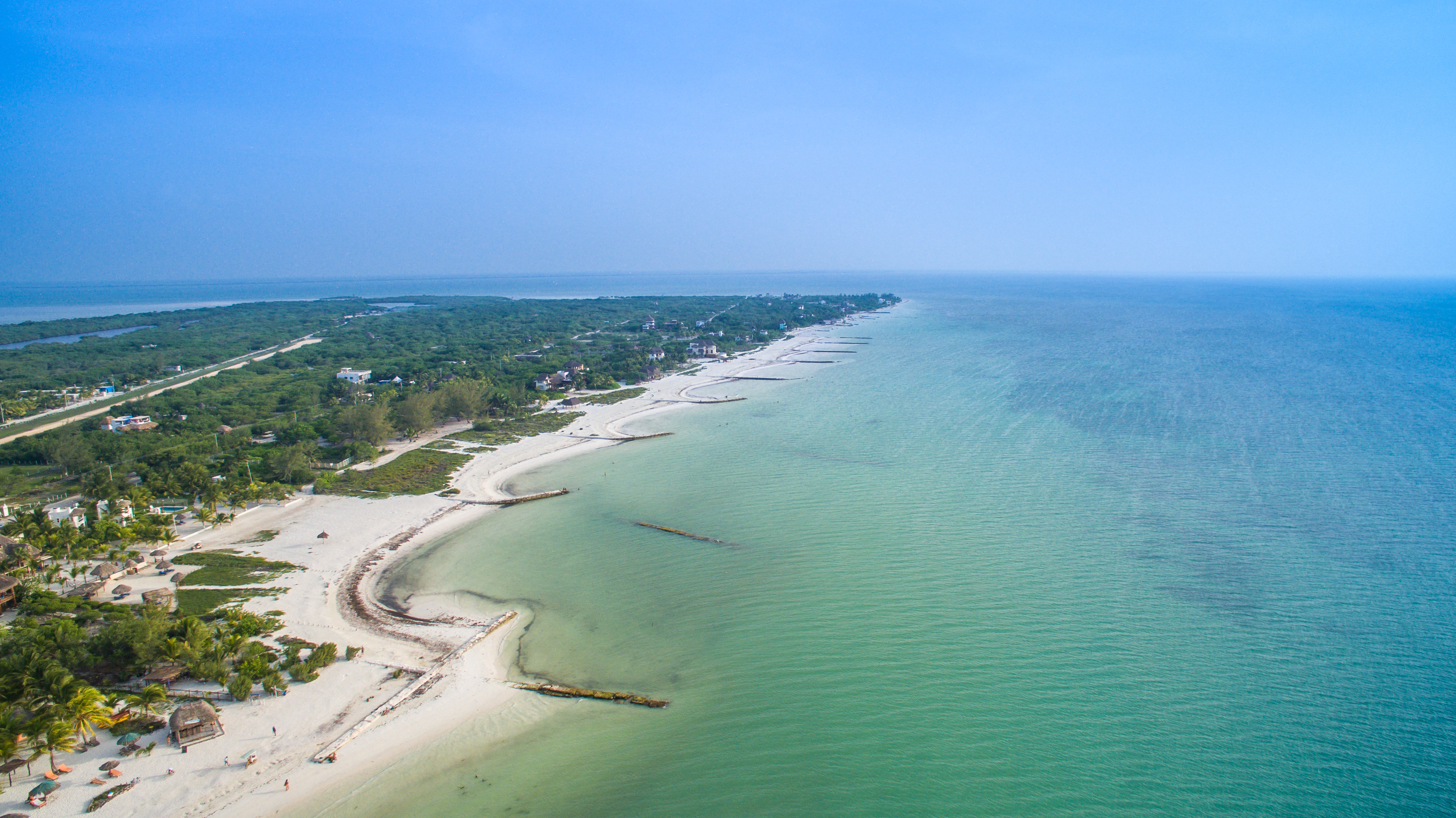
Holbox beaches

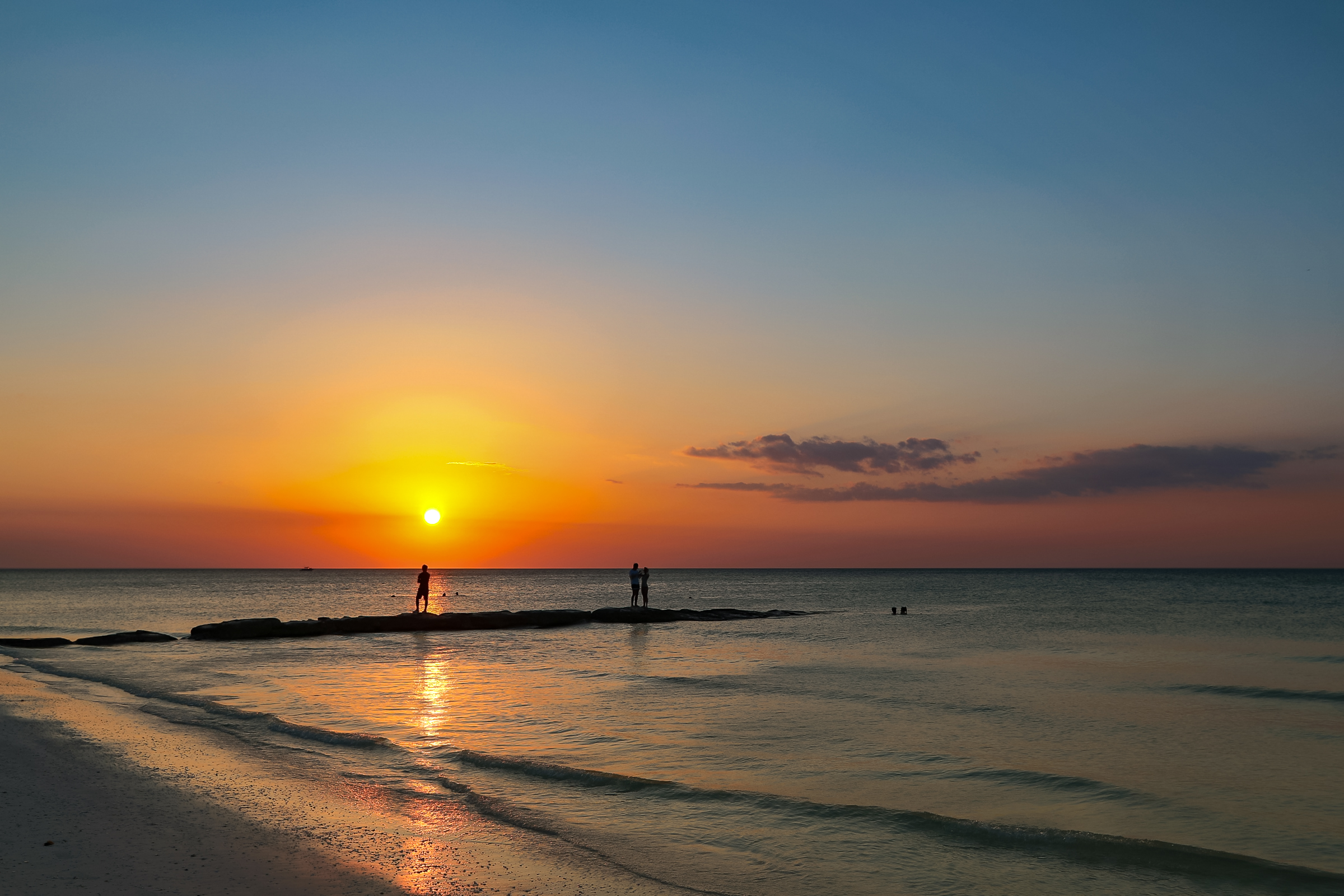
Sunset in Holbox, Mexico

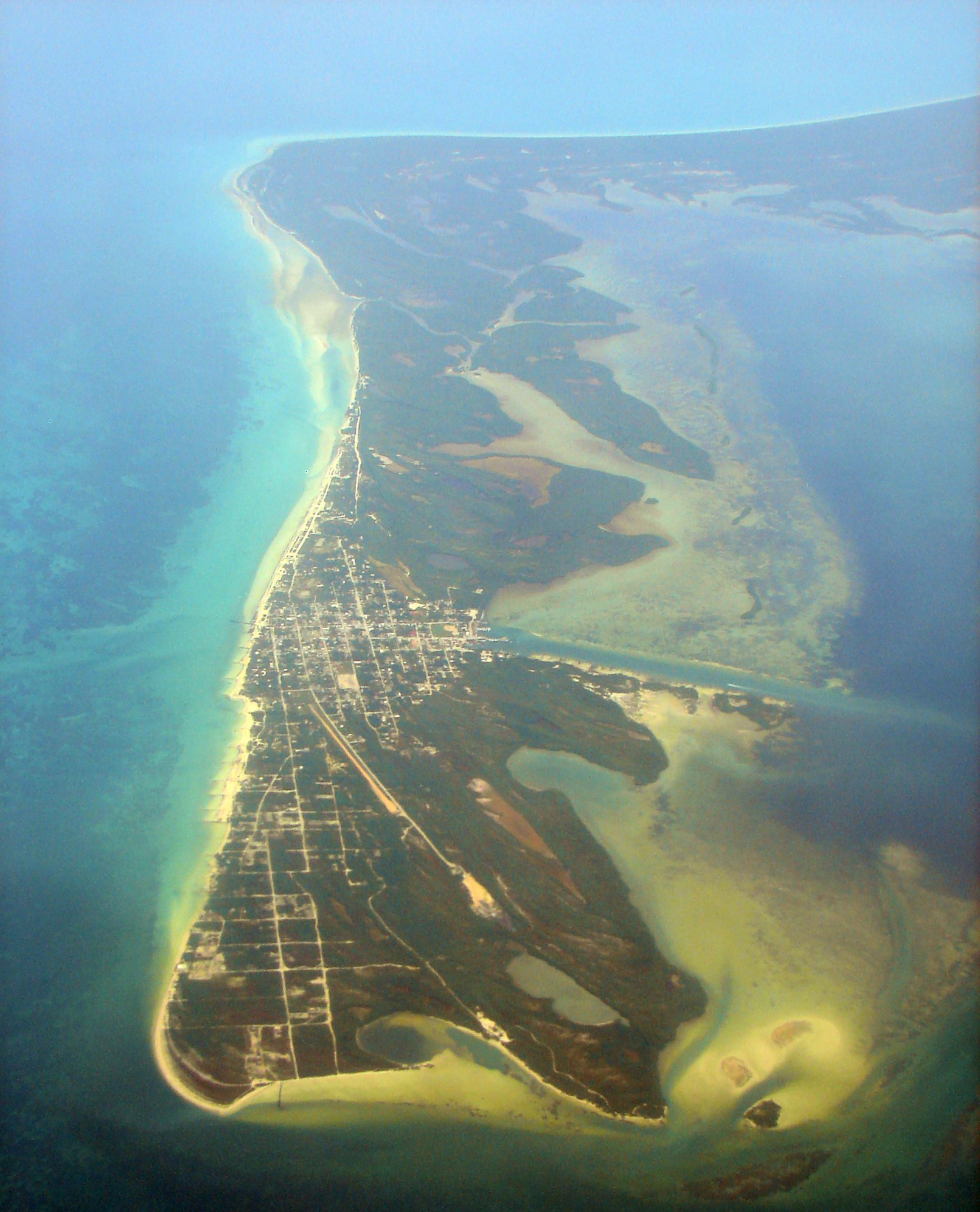
Aerial view of Holbox

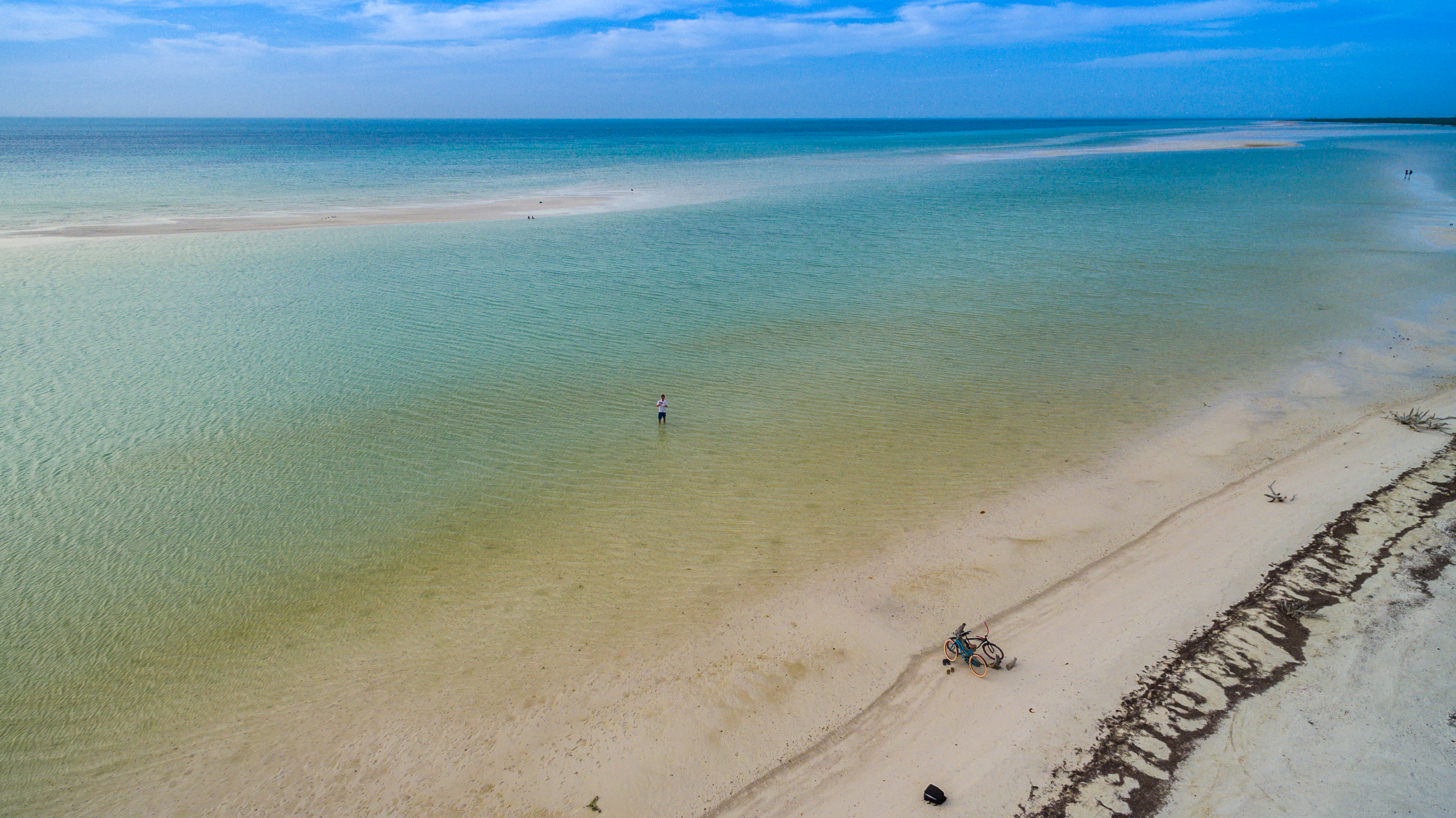
Sandbank in Holbox
