= Kantunilkín =

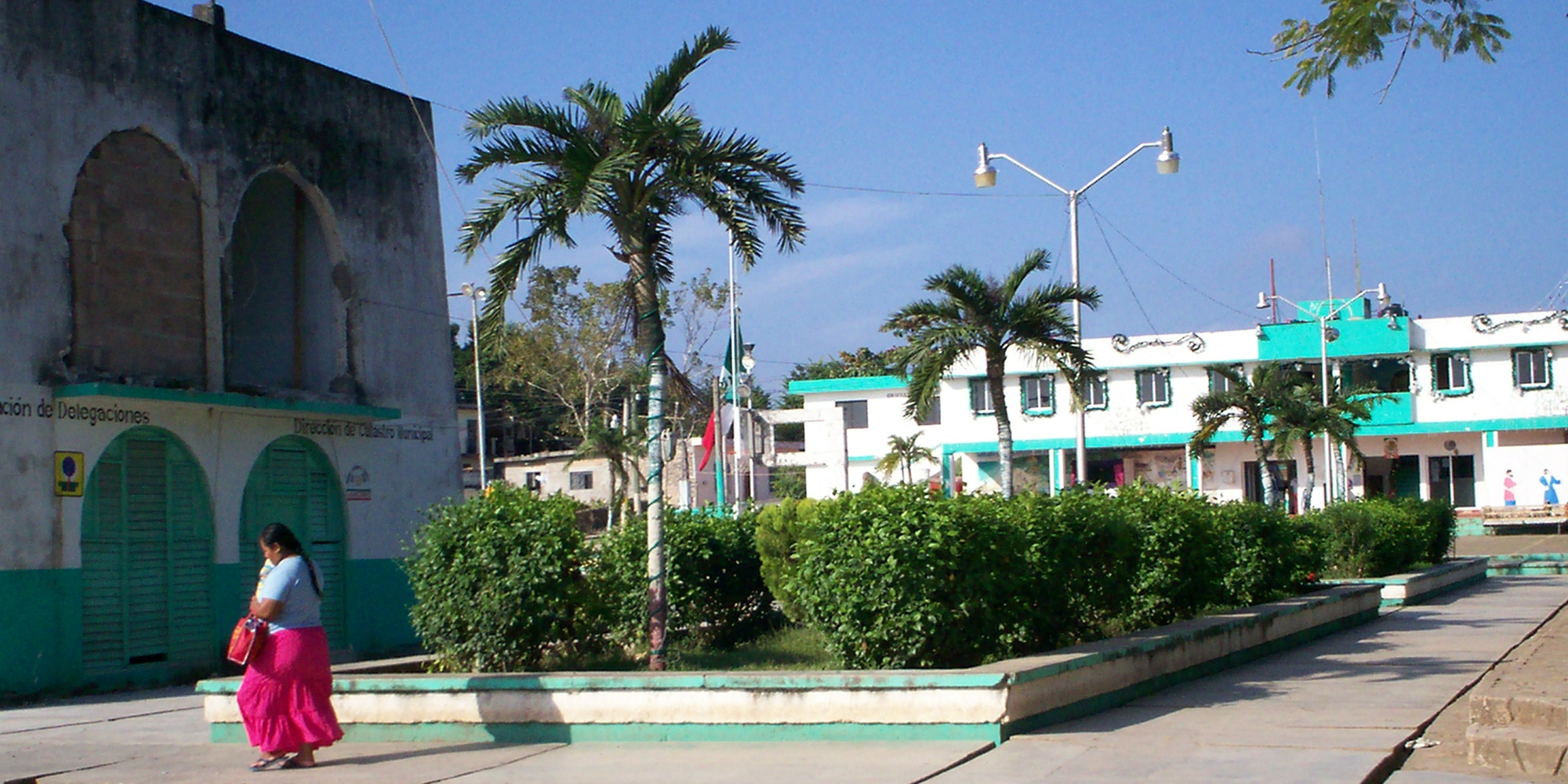
- Central plaza

- Location within Mexico
- Coordinates: 21°06′N 87°29′W
- Country: Mexico
- State: Quintana Roo
- Municipality: Lázaro Cárdenas
- Established: 1850

Government
  - Municipal President: Clementino Angulo Cupul

Population (2010)
  - Total: 7,150
- Time zone: UTC-5 (Eastern Standard Time)

Kantunilkín is the municipal seat and largest city in Lázaro Cárdenas in the Mexican state of Quintana Roo. According to the 2010 census, the city's population was 7,150 persons.

Kantunilkín was established in 1850 by Mayan Cruzobs during the Caste War of Yucatán, and originally called Nueva Santa Cruz–Kantunil. In 1859, the inhabitants accepted the general amnesty, allowing recognition by the Mexican government.
