= Same-sex marriage in Coahuila =

Same-sex marriage has been legal in Coahuila since 17 September 2014. On 1 September 2014, the Congress of Coahuila approved legislation opening marriage to same-sex couples by 19 votes to 1. The law was signed by Governor Rubén Moreira Valdez, and went into force on 1 September. The passage of the same-sex marriage bill made Coahuila the second Mexican state and the third jurisdiction in Mexico, after Mexico City and Quintana Roo, to legalize same-sex marriage, as well as the first state to do so via legislative means.

Previously, Congress had enacted a law recognizing civil unions for same-sex couples in January 2007. These unions provided some of the rights and benefits of marriage.

== Civil unions ==
Discussion on the legalization of civil unions in Coahuila started as early as November 2006, simultaneously with the discussion then ongoing in Mexico City. On 11 January 2007, the Congress of Coahuila voted 20–13 to legalize same-sex civil unions under the name "civil solidarity pact" (PCS; Spanish: pacto civil de solidaridad, pronounced [ˈpaɣto siˈβil de soliðaɾiˈðað]), which gave property and inheritance rights to same-sex couples; similar to France's civil solidarity pact and Germany's registered life partnership. The legislation was signed by Governor Humberto Moreira. This made Coahuila the second jurisdiction in Mexico after Mexico City to recognize same-sex unions.

"The PCS represented a sensible response to the existence of citizens who traditionally have been victims of discrimination, humiliation and abuse. This does not have to do with morality. It has to do with legality. As human beings, we have to protect them as they are. It has to do with civil liberty," said Congresswoman Julieta López Fuentes from the centrist Institutional Revolutionary Party (PRI), whose members voted for the law. Deputy Luis Mendoza Balderas, of the center-right National Action Party (PAN), which opposed the law, said it was an "attack against the family, which is society's natural group and is formed by a man and a woman." Other than that, the PCS drew little opposition. Bishop Raúl Vera, who headed the Roman Catholic Diocese of Saltillo, declined to condemn the law. While Vera insisted that "two women or two men cannot get married," he also saw gay people as a vulnerable minority. "Today we live in a society that is composed in a different way. There are people who do not want to marry under the law or in the church. They need legal protection. I should not abandon these people." Unlike Mexico City's law, once same-sex couples have registered in Coahuila, the state protects their rights no matter where they live in the country. Twenty days after the law had passed, the country's first same-sex civil union took place in Saltillo between 29-year-olds Karina Almaguer Argüello and Karla López Castillo, a lesbian couple from Tamaulipas. Between 2007 and 2013, 426 same-sex couples entered into civil unions, of which 36 had been annulled by the end of 2013.

11 January 2007 vote in the Congress
Party	Voted for	Voted against	Abstained	Absent (Did not vote)
Institutional Revolutionary Party	19: Jorge Abdalá Serna; José Alcalá de la Peña; Juan Ayup Guerrero; Román Cepeda González; Francisco Cruz Sánchez; Juan de la Luna González; Raúl González Valdés; Leocadio Hernández Torres; Julieta López Fuentes; Antonio Marcos Villarreal; Jesús Montemayor Garza; Julián Montoya de la Fuente; José Moreno Aguirre; Guadalupe Resendiz Boone; Miguel Riquelme Solís; Francisco Saracho Navarro; Jeanne Snydelaar Hardwicke; Alfio Vega de la Peña; Demetrio Zúñiga Sánchez	–	–	–
National Action Party	–	9: José Cortés Lozano; César Flores Sosa; Silvia Garza Galván; Luis Gurza Jaidar; José Jacinto Pacheco; Luis Mendoza Balderas; José Meynéz Varela; Jesús Pérez Valenzuela; Jorge Rosales Saade	–	–
Democratic Unity of Coahuila	–	2: Alfredo Garza Castillo; Jorge Guajardo Garza	–	–
Party of the Democratic Revolution	–	1: Genaro Fuantos Sánchez	–	1: Lorenzo Dávila Hernández
Ecologist Green Party of Mexico	–	1: José Sandoval Rodríguez	–	–
Labor Party	1: Virgilio Maltos Long	–	–	–
Total	20	13	0	1
Total	58.8%	38.2%	0.0%	2.9%

== Same-sex marriage ==
=== Legislative action ===
On 5 March 2013, Congressman Samuel Acevedo Flores from the Social Democratic Party introduced bills to the Congress of Coahuila to legalize same-sex marriages and adoption by same-sex couples. On 11 February 2014, the Congress approved the adoption bill with a vote of 23 in favor and two against; however, debate on same-sex marriage continued. On 8 August 2014, the Congress again began discussions regarding same-sex marriage. The bill passed 19–1 on 1 September. It was signed by Governor Rubén Moreira Valdez, and took effect on 17 September 2014. The first couple to marry were Jesus Covarrubias Monsivais and Luis Reyes Soto in Saltillo on 20 September. Article 139 of the Family Code now reads: Marriage is the union of two people who consent to establish a shared life based on affection, respect, equal treatment, and mutual support, and who freely, responsibly, voluntarily, and in an informed manner make reproductive decisions that align with their life plan, including the possibility of procreating or adopting. (Note: Spanish: El matrimonio es la unión de dos personas que consienten en realizar una comunidad de vida basada en el afecto, respeto, igualdad de trato y ayuda mutua, y toman de manera libre, responsable, voluntaria e informada, las decisiones reproductivas que se ajustan a su proyecto de vida, incluida la posibilidad de procrear o adoptar.)

1 September 2014 vote in the Congress
Party	Voted for	Voted against	Abstained	Absent (Did not vote)
Institutional Revolutionary Party	12: Cuauhtémoc Arzola Hernández; Juan Ayup Guerrero; Ana Boone Godoy; Juan Botello Nájera; Fernando de la Fuente Villareal; Rodrigo Fuentes Ávila; Ricardo López Campos; Antonio Marcos Villareal; Eliseo Mendoza Berrueto; Lucía Ramos Ramos; José Rodríguez Herrera; Indalecio Rodríguez López	–	–	3: Jorge Alanís Canales; Manolo Jiménez Salinas; José Moreno Aguirre
Coahuila First Party	1: Francisco Dávila Rodríguez	–	–	1: Norberto Ríos Pérez
Ecologist Green Party of Mexico	1: Víctor Zamora Rodríguez	–	–	1: José Sandoval Rodríguez
National Action Party	2: Edmundo Gómez Garza; Fernando Gutiérrez Pérez	–	–	–
New Alliance Party	2: María Rodríguez Hernández; Simón Vargas Hernández	–	–	–
Democratic Unity of Coahuila	–	1: Evaristo Pérez Rivera	–	–
Social Democratic Party	1: Samuel Acevedo Flores	–	–	–
Total	19	1	0	5
Total	76.0%	4.0%	0.0%	20.0%

Coahuila was the second jurisdiction to reform its laws and the third jurisdiction in Mexico to legalize same-sex marriage, after Mexico City and Quintana Roo. Subsequent legislation and rulings from the Supreme Court of Justice of the Nation, which held that bans on same-sex marriage violate Articles 1 and 4 of the Constitution of Mexico (Spanish: Constitución Política; Kickapoo: Inakonikani), have expanded same-sex marriage to the entire country.

=== Statistics ===
The following table shows the number of same-sex marriages performed in Coahuila since legalization in 2014 as reported by the National Institute of Statistics and Geography. Data published in August 2018 showed that about half of the same-sex marriages performed in Coahuila involved a partner from another state or country.

Number of marriages performed in Coahuila
Year	Same-sex			Opposite-sex	Total	% same-sex
Year	Female	Male	Total	Opposite-sex	Total	% same-sex
2014	42	26	68	16,987	17,055	0.40%
2015	108	61	169	16,997	17,166	0.98%
2016	111	82	193	15,315	15,508	1.24%
2017	112	53	165	14,917	15,082	1.09%
2018	205	102	307	14,564	14,871	2.06%
2019	97	61	158	14,824	14,982	1.05%
2020	46	31	77	11,740	11,817	0.65%
2021	68	45	113	14,759	14,872	0.76%
2022	77	45	122	14,194	14,316	0.85%
2023	54	21	75	14,167	14,242	0.53%
2024	30	15	45	14,084	14,129	0.32%

== Public opinion ==
A 2017 opinion poll conducted by the Strategic Communication Office (Gabinete de Comunicación Estratégica) found that 44% of Coahuila residents supported same-sex marriage, while 52% were opposed. According to a 2018 survey by the National Institute of Statistics and Geography, 47% of the Coahuila public opposed same-sex marriage.

== See also ==
- Same-sex marriage in Mexico
- LGBT rights in Mexico
- Same-sex marriage in Mexico City
