= Same-sex marriage in Quintana Roo =

Same-sex marriage is legal in Quintana Roo. The first two same-sex marriages occurred in Kantunilkín on 28 November 2011 after it was discovered that the Quintana Roo Civil Code did not specify sex or gender requirements for marriage. However, marriages were suspended in January 2012 upon review by the state's Secretary General of Government. The two marriages were annulled by Governor Roberto Borge Angulo in April 2012, but these annulments were reversed by the Secretary General of Government on 3 May. The Secretary's decision allows for future same-sex marriages to be performed in Quintana Roo. Quintana Roo was the first Mexican state, and the second jurisdiction in Mexico after Mexico City, to legalize same-sex marriage.

On 28 September 2021, the Congress of Quintana Roo passed legislation 15–0 recognising same-sex concubinage providing similar rights and obligations as marriage. The law took effect on 23 October 2021.

== Legal history ==
=== Developments in 2011–2012 ===
The Civil Code of Quintana Roo does not define gender requirements for marriage, specifying only "people interested in getting married". (Note: Article 680 of the Civil Code states: Las personas que pretendan contraer matrimonio presentarán un escrito a la persona Oficial del Registro Civil, ante la cual celebrarán el contrato respectivo, que exprese: [...] III. Qué es su voluntad unirse en matrimonio. (translating to "Persons intending to marry shall submit a written document to the Civil Registry Officer, before whom they shall enter into the respective contract, stating: [...] III. That it is their wish to enter into marriage.")) A same-sex couple, María Novelo Infante and Areli Castro Garcí, applied for a marriage license in Cancún and Chetumal after discovering this legal quirk, but officials in both cities rejected their applications, arguing that a heterosexual marriage was implied. The couple then applied in Lázaro Cárdenas Municipality, where authorities accepted the application. Quintana Roo's first two same-sex marriages were held in Kantunilkín on 28 November 2011. Cancún and other resort areas in Quintana Roo planned to hold a same-sex group wedding in January 2012. However, newspaper Reforma reported that upcoming ceremonies were suspended following an order by the Quintana Roo Secretary General of Government, Luis González Flores, to review the legality of the ceremonies. In April 2012, both marriages were annulled by Governor Roberto Borge Angulo. On 3 May 2012, the Secretary General of Government (Secretaría de Gobierno) reversed the annulments. In effect, the Secretary General interpreted the Civil Code as containing no provisions forbidding same-sex marriage, and used its executive administrative authority to reverse the earlier annulments, directing civil registry offices to accept applications from same-sex couples. Both marriages became legal the following month because there was no estoppel filed in due time.

The decision made Quintana Roo the first Mexican state, and the second jurisdiction in Mexico after Mexico City, to legalize same-sex marriage. Subsequent legislation and rulings from the Supreme Court of Justice of the Nation have expanded same-sex marriage to the entire country. The Supreme Court has ruled that bans on same-sex marriage violate Articles 1 and 4 of the Constitution of Mexico (Spanish: Constitución Política; Yucatec Maya: Almejen Noj A’almajt’aanil). Article 1 states:

Any form of discrimination, based on ethnic or national origin, gender, age, disabilities, social status, medical conditions, religion, opinions, sexual orientation, marital status, or any other form, which violates the human dignity or seeks to annul or diminish the rights and freedoms of the people, is prohibited. (Note: In some official and indigenous languages of Quintana Roo: Spanish: Queda prohibida toda discriminación motivada por origen étnico o nacional, el género, la edad, las discapacidades, la condición social, las condiciones de salud, la religión, las opiniones, las preferencias sexuales, el estado civil o cualquier otra que atente contra la dignidad humana y tenga por objeto anular o menoscabar los derechos y libertades de las personas.; Yucatec Maya: Ku we’et’el tuláakal péech’ óolal chéen tu yóok’olal u ch’i’ibalil wáaj u nojlu’umil u taalbal máak, u wíiniknáalil, u ja’abil, u yaayaj óolalil, bix yanil u kuxtal yéetel u toj óolalil, u yoksajk’uujil, ba’ax yaan tu tuukul, máax uts tu yich, bix anil tu táan kaaj, wáaj tu yóok’olal uláak’ ba’al beetik k’aas ti’ u tsikbe’enil máak, yéetel u tuukulil u xu’ulsik wáaj u péets’ óoltik u páajtalil yéetel u jáalk’abilo’ob máak.)

=== Subsequent changes ===
Same-sex marriage in Mexico

In 2013, a lesbian couple in Tulum were denied a marriage license and forced to obtain an amparo granting them the right to marry. The court ruled the refusal unconstitutional and ordered the state to prevent further discrimination against same-sex couples, requiring all civil registry offices in Quintana Roo to process marriage applications from same-sex couples. In September 2014, Bacalar Municipality approved changes in its marriage forms to equalize procedures for all marriages. At the same time, officials in Playa del Carmen said that same-sex couples could begin marrying from the last week of September 2014. Othón P. Blanco Municipality announced that their first same-sex marriage would occur on 26 November 2014, and José María Morelos Municipality announced in 2017 that it had equalized procedures for all marriages, with marriage services also available in Yucatec Maya.

In November 2014, media outlets reported that a bill to officially codify same-sex marriage in the Civil Code would be introduced to the Congress of Quintana Roo and voted on in the current legislative session, thereby replacing the loophole used by couples. The measure stalled and was not voted on. Another bill also stalled in 2017. On 28 September 2021, Congress passed legislation—proposed by deputies Ana Pamplona Ramírez of the Party of the Democratic Revolution and Hernán Villatoro Barrios of the Labor Party—by a 15–0 vote recognising same-sex concubinage providing similar rights, benefits and obligations as marriage. The law was signed by Governor Carlos Joaquín González, published in the official state journal on 22 October and took effect the following day. Article 825bis of the Civil Code now defines concubinage as: Concubinage is the union of two people with reciprocal rights and obligations, provided that, without any legal impediments to marry, they have lived together in a constant and permanent manner for a minimum period of two years immediately preceding the establishment of the rights and obligations referred to in this Chapter. (Note: Spanish: El concubinato es la unión de dos personas con derechos y obligaciones recíprocos, siempre que sin impedimentos legales para contraer matrimonio, han vivido en común en forma constante y permanente por un período mínimo de dos años que precedan inmediatamente a la generación de derechos y obligaciones a los que alude este Capítulo.)

28 September 2021 vote in the Congress
Party	Voted for	Voted against	Abstained	Absent (Did not vote)
National Regeneration Movement	6: Luis Chávez Zepeda; Linda Cobos Castro; Edgar Gasca Arceo; Julio Montenegro Aguilar; Paula Pech Vázquez; María Torres Gómez	–	–	3: Erika Castillo Acosta; Euterpe Gutiérrez Valasis; Maria Trejo Quijano
Ecologist Green Party of Mexico	1: Tyara Schleske de Ariño	–	2: Erick Miranda García; Judith Rodríguez Villanueva	1: José Ruíz de Chávez
National Action Party	2: Reyna Durán Ovando; Aurora Pool Cauich	–	1: Kira Iris San	1: Eduardo Martínez Arcila
Party of the Democratic Revolution	2: Ana Pamplona Ramírez; Iris Mora Vallejo	–	–	1: Pedro Pérez Díaz
Labor Party	2: Roberto Erales Jiménez; Hernán Villatoro Barrios	–	–	–
Authentic Social Movement	1: José Guillén López	–	–	–
Citizens' Movement	–	–	–	1: Chanito Toledo Medina
Institutional Revolutionary Party	1: Carlos Hernández Blanco	–	–	–
Total	15	0	3	7
Total	60.0%	0.0%	12.0%	28.0%

In January 2018, a married same-sex couple in Puerto Morelos were granted the right to register their child. In April 2018, with the help of the State Human Rights Commission, a same-sex couple in Cancún were also allowed to register their newborn son. According to 2021 statistics from the civil registry, about 30 to 40 lesbian couples register their children in the state every year.

== Native Mexicans ==
While many Indigenous cultures historically practiced polygamy to some extent, there are no records of same-sex marriages being performed in these cultures in the way they are commonly defined in Western legal systems. However, many Indigenous communities recognize identities and relationships that may be placed on the LGBT spectrum. The Yucatec Maya recognized certain forms of institutionalised same-sex relations. Some shamans engaged in homosexual acts with their patients, and priests engaged in ritualized homosexual acts with their gods. Anthropologist Walter Lee Williams wrote with respect to the Yucatec Maya: "After my arrival in Yucatán, I soon learned that the society provides a de facto acceptance of same-sex relations for males. It did not take long to establish contacts, and my informants suggested that a large majority of the male population is at certain times sexually active with other males. This usually occurs in the years between thirteen and thirty, when sexual desire is strongest, but it also involves men older than that. Marriage to a woman does not seem to have much effect on the occurrence and amount of homosexual behavior." Carvings, rituals and stories were explicit about sexual diversity.

The first Mayan same-sex marriage was performed in Kantunilkín in October 2022 between Lidia Holi Poot and Lizbet García Domínguez. The couple held a civil marriage ceremony as well as a traditional Mayan ceremony officiated by two priests.

== Marriage statistics ==
As of mid-December 2014, officials announced that 14 same-sex marriages had been performed in Quintana Roo. The National Institute of Statistics and Geography reported that 163 same-sex marriages were performed in 2018, of which 96 (59%) were between two women and 67 (41%) between two men. According to data from the civil registry, most same-sex marriages in 2018 took place in the northern parts of the state, particularly in the municipalities of Benito Juárez, Solidaridad, Cozumel, Puerto Morelos, Isla Mujeres and Tulum, but also Bacalar in the south. From January to August 2018, three same-sex marriages were performed in Othón P. Blanco Municipality, while only one occurred in José María Morelos Municipality.

Data from the civil registry showed that 277 and 210 same-sex marriages were performed in Quintana Roo in 2019 and 2020, respectively, with most being between two men.

== Public opinion ==
A 2017 opinion poll conducted by the Strategic Communication Office (Gabinete de Comunicación Estratégica) found that 56% of Quintana Roo residents supported same-sex marriage, while 37.5% were opposed. According to a 2018 survey by the National Institute of Statistics and Geography, 38% of the Quintana Roo public opposed same-sex marriage.

== See also ==
- LGBT rights in Mexico
- Same-sex marriage in Mexico
