= Lázaro Cárdenas, Quintana Roo =

Lázaro Cárdenas
- Municipality
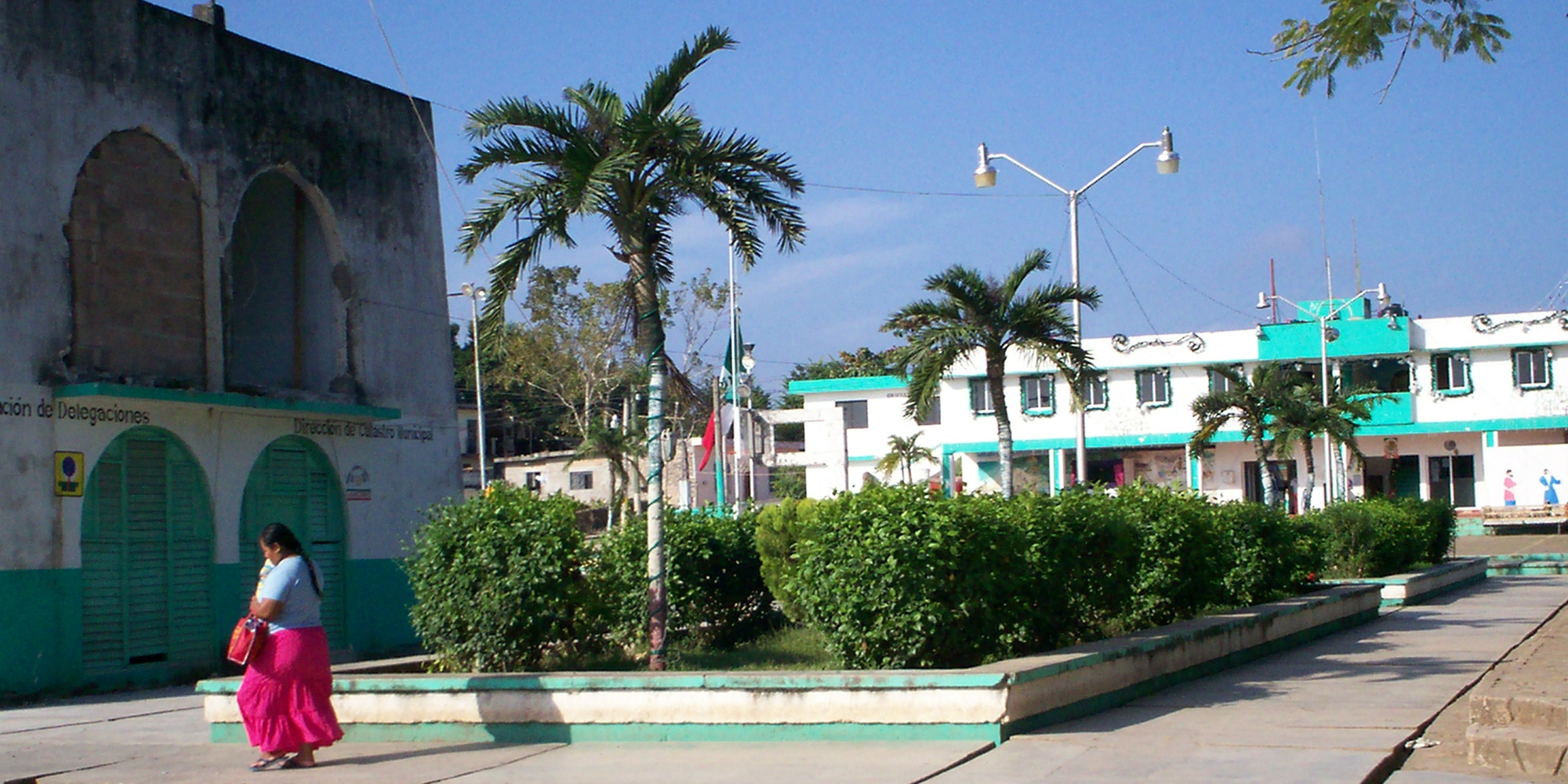
- Kantunil Kin central plaza

- Coat of arms

- Location of Lázaro Cárdenas in Quintana Roo

- Location within Mexico
- Coordinates: 21°06′N 87°29′W
- Country: Mexico
- State: Quintana Roo
- Named for: Lázaro Cárdenas
- Municipal seat: Kantunilkín

Government
  - Municipal President: Clementino Angulo

Area
  - Municipality: 3,881 km^{2} (1,498 sq mi)
- Elevation: 20 m (66 ft)

Population (2020)
  - Municipality: 29,171
  - Density: 7.516/km^{2} (19.47/sq mi)
  - Urban: 7,150
- Time zone: UTC-5 (Eastern Standard Time)
- INEGI Code: 23007
- Website: www.lazarocardenas.gob.mx

Lázaro Cárdenas (Spanish: [ˈlasaɾo ˈkaɾðenas]) is one of the eleven municipalities that make up the Mexican state of Quintana Roo. Its municipal seat is the town of Kantunilkín, which was founded on 10 October 1859. Its borders are, to the west, the municipalities of Tizimín and Chemax in the state of Yucatán, to the east the municipalities of Isla Mujeres and Benito Juárez, and to the south Solidaridad.

It is named after Lázaro Cárdenas del Río who was President of Mexico from 1934 to 1940.

== Geography ==
Like most of the Yucatan Peninsula, Lázaro Cárdenas is entirely flat with a gentle slope towards the sea, so from west to east.

Like the rest of the peninsula's surface, the land has a limestone base that does not allow the formation of surface water flows such as rivers and streams, the water instead forms flows in underground rivers that sometimes rise to the surface in the cenotes. Lakes and cenotes are the major bodies of water in the municipality.

=== Communities ===
The municipality is made up of 82 populated localities (localidades), as well as 81 unpopulated localities. The largest localities (cities, towns, and villages) are:

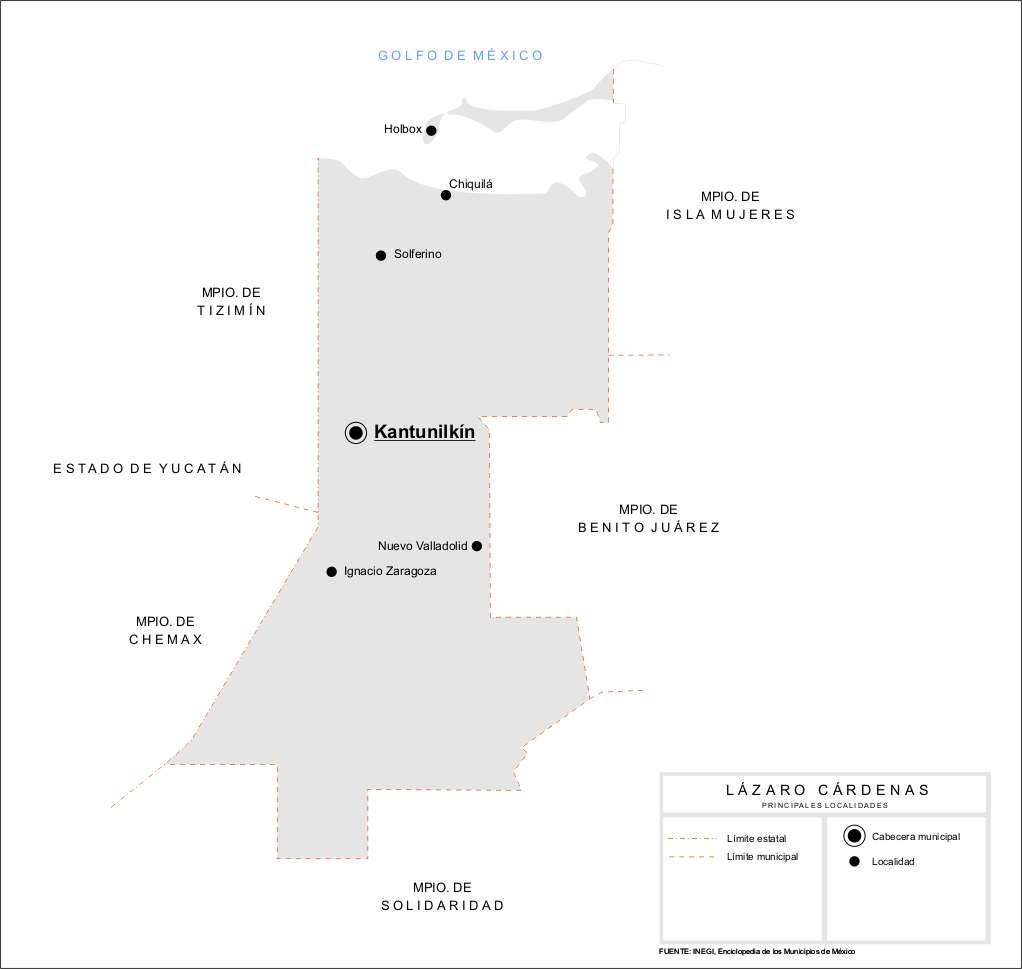
Map of Lazaro Cardenas, Municipality

| Name | Population (2010 Census) |
|---|---|
| Kantunilkín | 7,150 |
| Ignacio Zaragoza | 2,213 |
| Holbox | 1,486 |
| Chiquilá | 1,466 |
| Nuevo Valladolid | 1,294 |
| Nuevo Xcán | 1,130 |
| El Tintal | 1,074 |
| San Ángel | 1,041 |
| El Ideal | 818 |
| Solferino | 799 |
| San Francisco | 767 |
| El Cedral | 752 |
| Nuevo Durango | 225 |
| Total municipality | 25,333 |

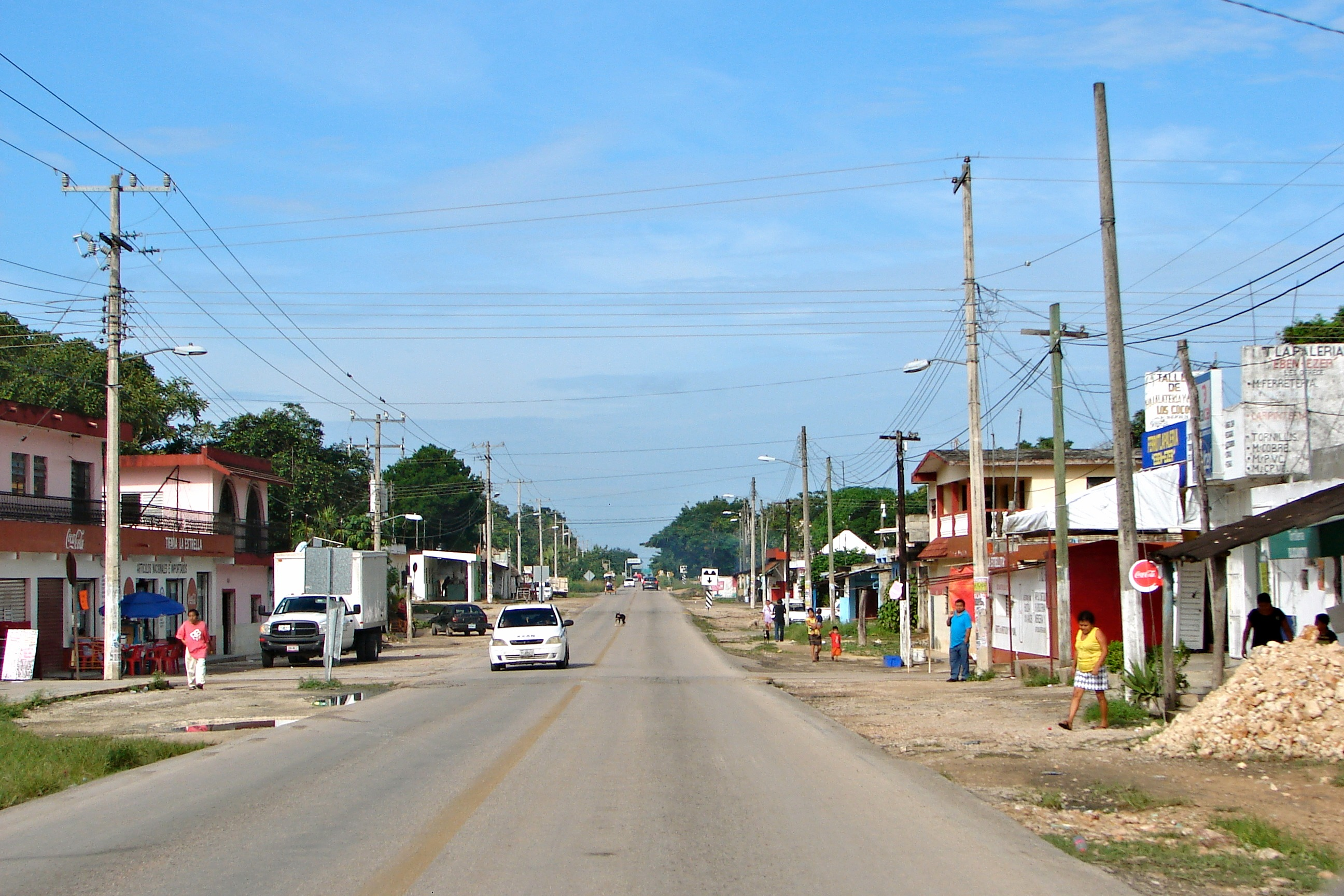
Ignacio Zaragoza

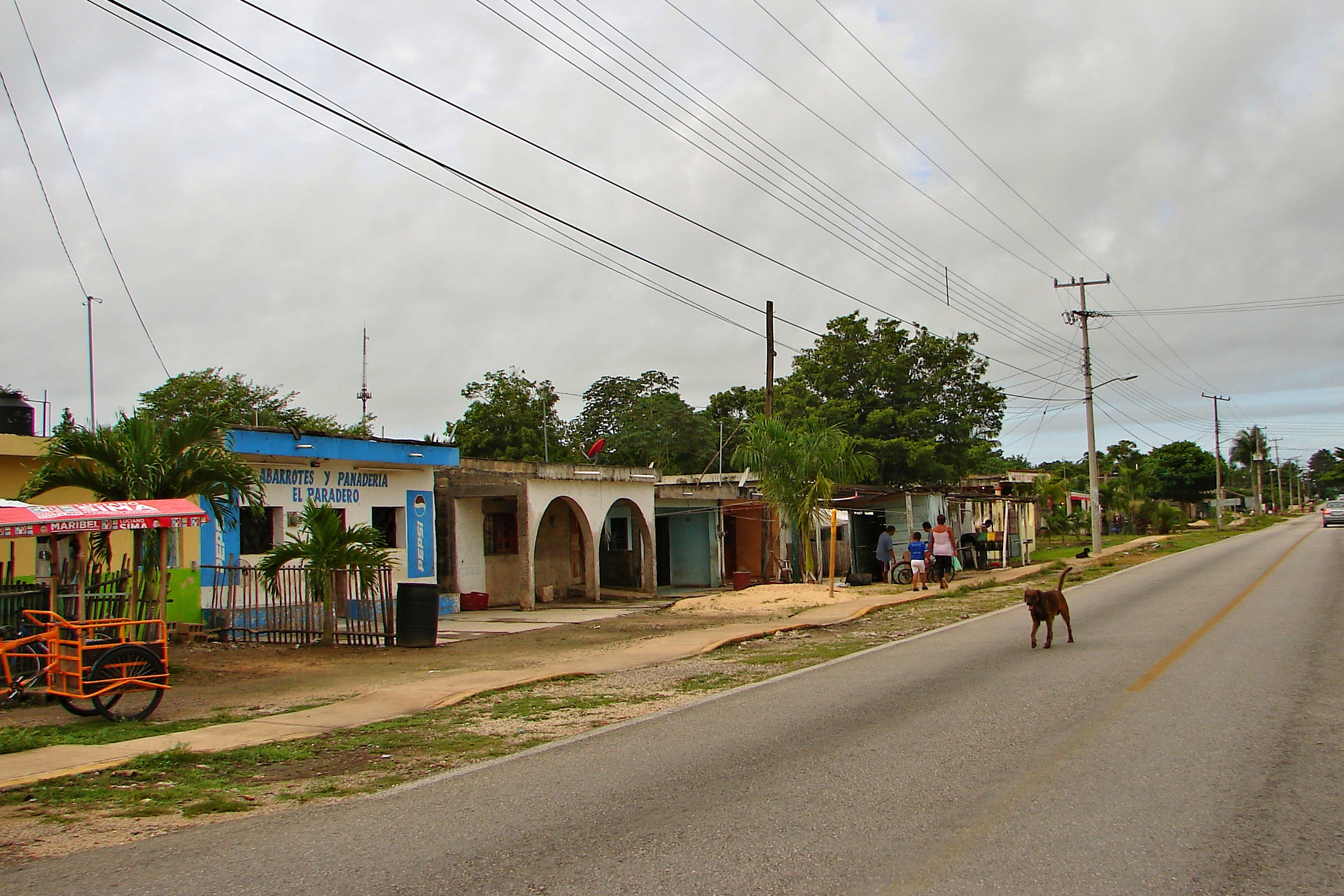
Nuevo Valladolid

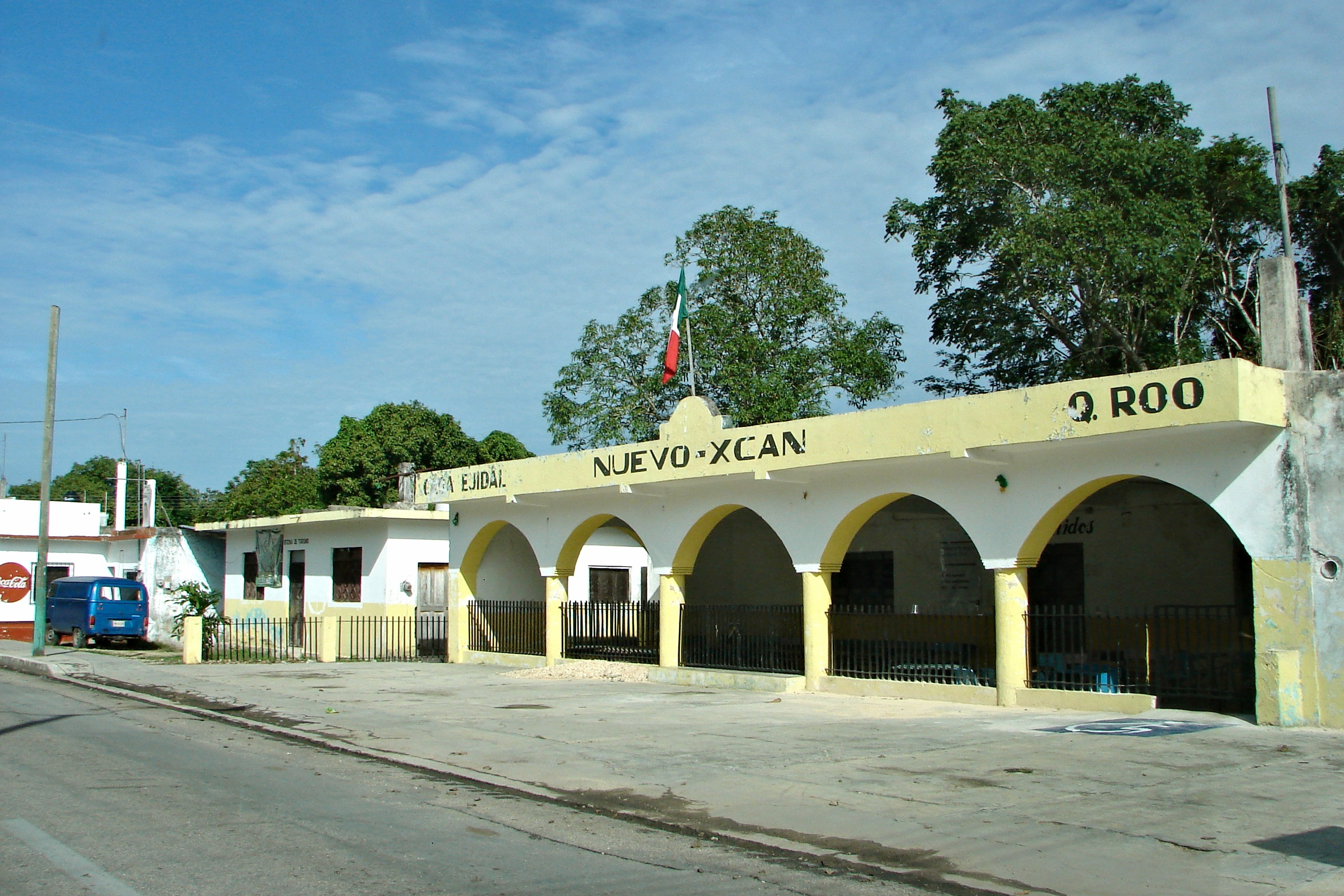
Nuevo X-Can

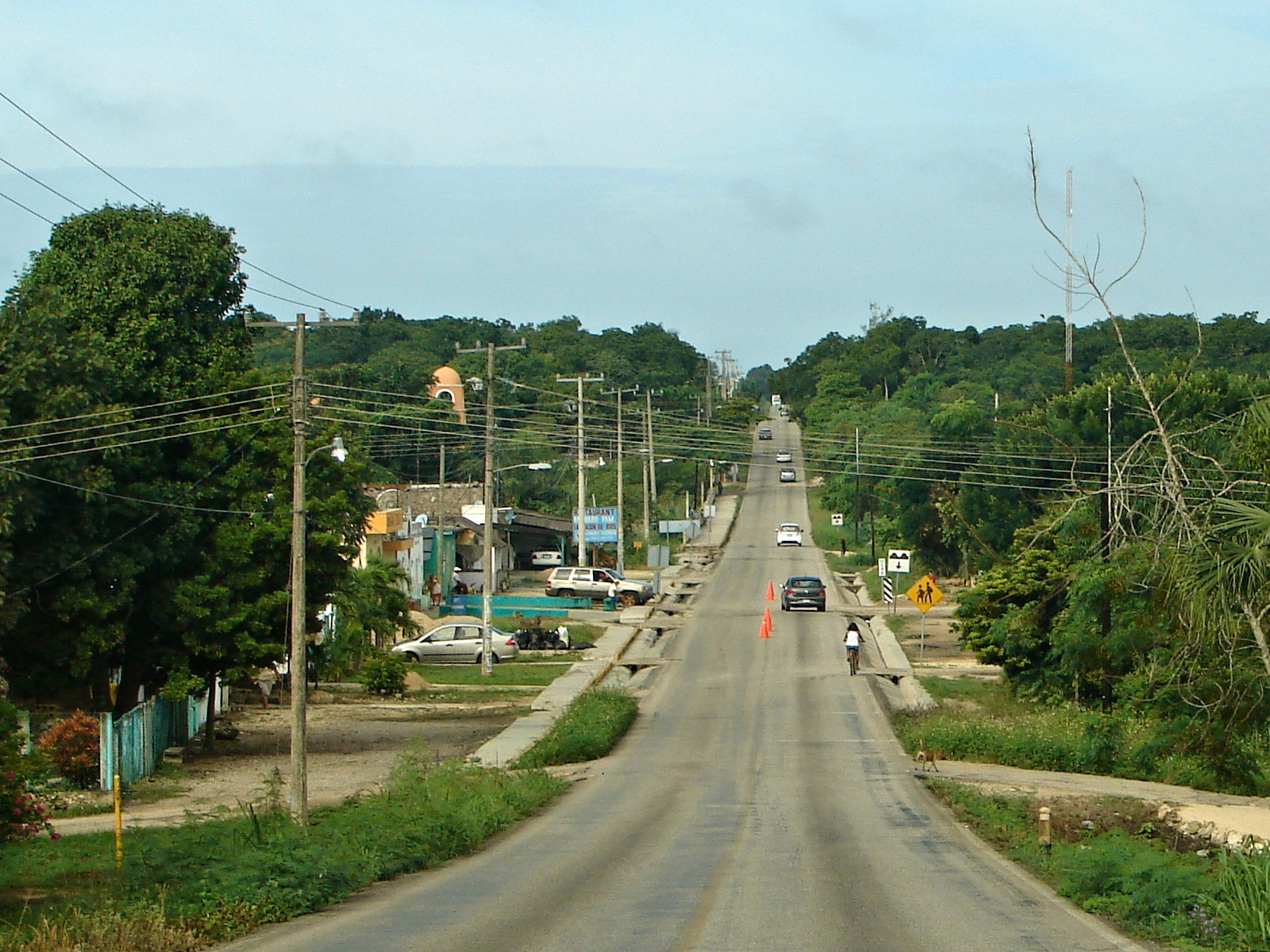
El Tintal

== Demographics ==
Historical population
| Year | Pop. | ±% p.a. |
|---|---|---|
| 1995 | 18,307 | — |
| 2000 | 20,411 | +2.20% |
| 2005 | 22,434 | +1.91% |
| 2010 | 25,333 | +2.46% |
Source: INEGI Instituto Nacional de Estadística y Geografía
