= Josefina, Santa Fe =

Josefina
- Commune
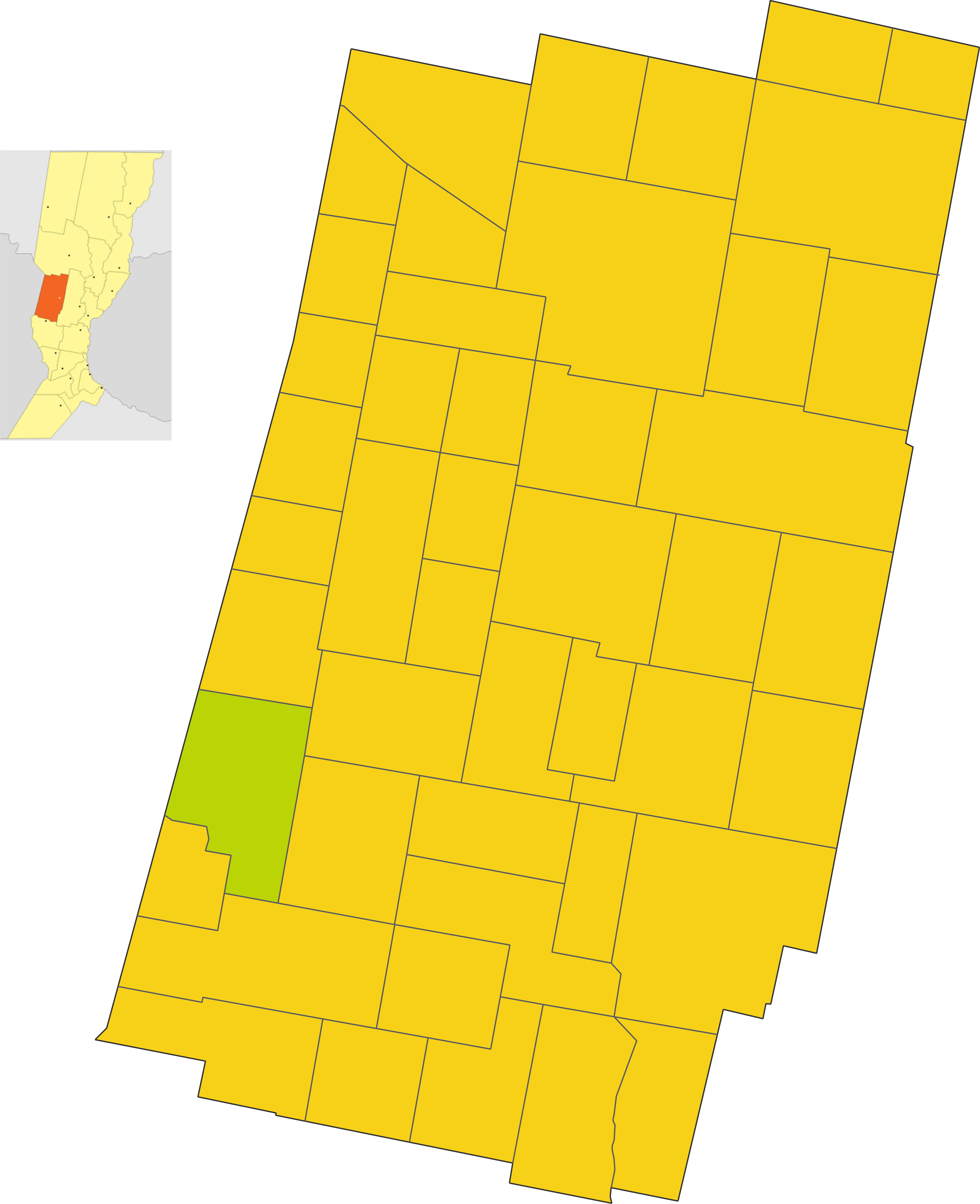
- The commune of Josefina in the Castellanos Department
- Coordinates: 31°24′00″S 61°59′00″W
- Country: ARG
- Province: Santa Fe
- Department: Castellanos
- Established: 19 March 1886

Government
  - Presidente comunal: Jorgelina Sicardi, JXC

Area
  - Total: 176 km^{2} (68 sq mi)
- Elevation: 105 m (344 ft)
- Postal code: 2403
- Area code: 03492

Josefina is a commune located in the Castellanos Department of Santa Fe Province, in Argentina. It is 130 km from the provincial capital of Santa Fe.

== History ==
The Santa Fe Provincial Railway (now, FC Belgrano Cargas) went from Santa Fe through Aurelia, Rafaela, Lehmann, Ataliva, Humberto Primo, Moises Ville, to San Cristobal. Another branch of the same company joined Pilar (Santa Fe), Rafaela, Santa Clara de Saguier, Josefina, as far as San Francisco in the Province of Córdoba.

The first settlers were Mateo Brizio and family, Miguel Visconti and family, Sebastian Aimar, Jorge Aimar. Soon the Burgas, Carle and Rivello families were added.

The commune was officially formed on 19 March 1886. The commune is named after Josefina Rodríguez del Fresno, wife of the founder, Néstor Iriondo.

Another major feast day is celebrated on August 15 each year.

== Patron saint ==
The patron saint is San José. His feast day, named "Tortonose" is celebrated on 19 March yearly.

== Population ==
The population of Josefina proper is 1000 inhabitants as of 2001. The village of Acapulco, has approximately 2500 inhabitants while in the rural area there are 450 inhabitants. The remainder are scattered throughout Josefina. Two of the main rural villages are Capilla Votero and Campo Almendra.

== Sports ==
The following sports clubs are present in Josefina: Club Dep. Josefina, Club Social Dep. Josefina and Nueva Estrella.

== Radio and television ==
There is an FM radio station - 93.5 Radio San José and the television station is Diario Josefinos.
