= Pancalieri =

- Comune
- Comune di Pancalieri
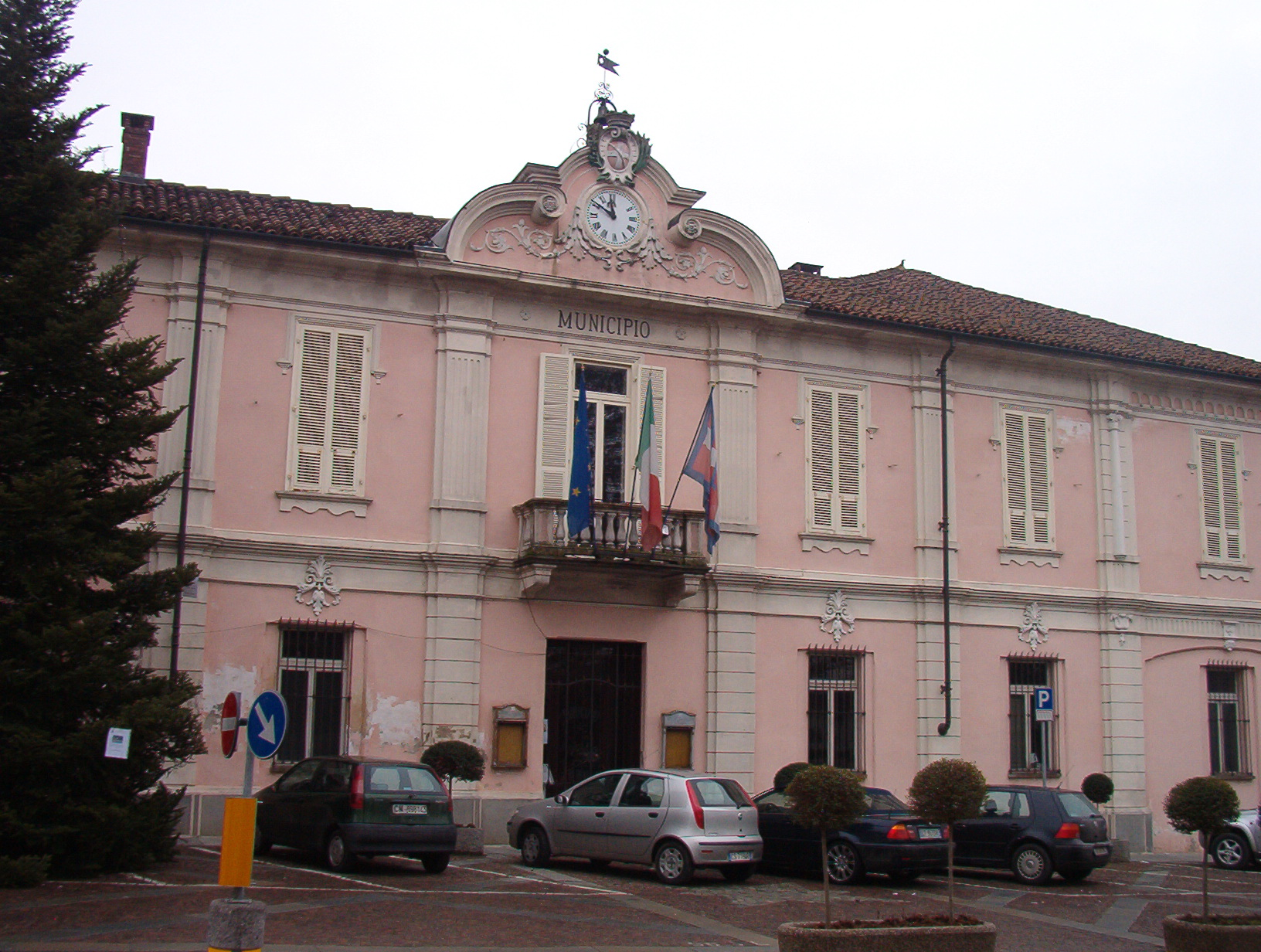
- Town hall.

- Coat of arms

- Location within Italy Location within Piedmont
- Coordinates: 44°50′N 7°35′E
- Country: Italy
- Region: Piedmont
- Metropolitan city: Turin (TO)

Government
  - Mayor: Luca Pochettino

Area
  - Total: 15.89 km^{2} (6.14 sq mi)
- Elevation: 243 m (797 ft)

Population (1 January 2024)
  - Total: 1,975
  - Density: 124.3/km^{2} (321.9/sq mi)
- Demonym: Pancalierese(i)
- Time zone: UTC+1 (CET)
  - Summer (DST): UTC+2 (CEST)
- Postal code: 10060
- Dialing code: 011
- Patron saint: San Nicolao
- Saint day: 6 December
- Website: Official website

Pancalieri is a comune (municipality) in the Metropolitan City of Turin in the Italian region Piedmont, about 30 km (19 mi) southwest of Turin.

Pancalieri borders the following municipalities: Osasio, Virle Piemonte, Vigone, Lombriasco, Casalgrasso, Villafranca Piemonte, Faule, and Polonghera.

== Twin towns and sister cities ==
Pancalieri is twinned with:

- Ataliva, Argentina, since 2003
