= List of twin towns and sister cities in Argentina =

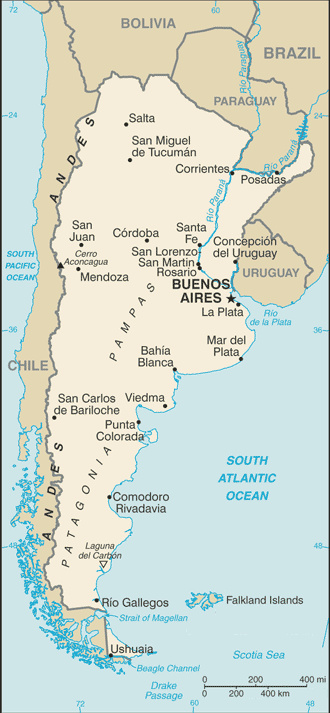
Map of Argentina

This is a list of municipalities in Argentina which have standing links to local communities in other countries known as "town twinning" (usually in Europe) or "sister cities" (usually in the rest of the world).

== A ==
Aldea Valle María

- Meinhard, Germany

Almirante Brown

- Isla Mujeres, Mexico
- Montevideo, Uruguay

Arrecifes

- Gamalero, Italy

Azul

- Alcalá de Henares, Spain

== B ==
Bahía Blanca

- Ashdod, Israel
- Chios, Greece
- Cienfuegos, Cuba
- Fermo, Italy
- Jacksonville, United States
- Reus, Spain
- San Isidro, Peru
- Talcahuano, Chile

Bariloche

- Aspen, United States
- L'Aquila, Italy
- Osorno, Chile
- Puerto Montt, Chile
- Punta Arenas, Chile
- Purranque, Chile
- St. Moritz, Switzerland

Buenos Aires

- Asunción, Paraguay
- Athens, Greece
- Beijing, China
- Berlin, Germany
- Bilbao, Spain
- Bogotá, Colombia
- Brasília, Brazil
- Cádiz, Spain
- Calabria, Italy
- Damascus, Syria
- Ferrara, Italy
- Galicia, Spain
- Guadix, Spain
- Guangzhou, China
- Kyiv, Ukraine
- Lima, Peru
- Madrid, Spain
- Miami, United States
- Montevideo, Uruguay
- Moscow, Russia
- Oviedo, Spain
- Rio de Janeiro, Brazil
- Santiago, Chile
- Santo Domingo, Dominican Republic
- Seville, Spain
- Tel Aviv, Israel
- Vigo, Spain
- Yerevan, Armenia

== C ==
Chascomús

- Isla Mujeres, Mexico

Córdoba

- Andalusia, Spain
- Campinas, Brazil
- Castile and León, Spain
- Ciutadella de Menorca, Spain
- Cochabamba, Bolivia
- Córdoba, Bolívar, Colombia
- Córdoba, Nariño, Colombia
- Córdoba, Quindío, Colombia
- Córdoba, Mexico
- Córdoba, Spain
- Córdoba, Venezuela
- Florianópolis, Brazil
- Friuli-Venezia Giulia, Italy
- Gyumri, Armenia
- Izhevsk, Russia
- Marín, Spain
- Montevideo, Uruguay
- Natal, Brazil
- Piedmont, Italy
- Santa Cruz de la Sierra, Bolivia
- Turin, Italy
- Valparaíso, Chile
- Xi'an, China

== E ==
Esperanza

- Champéry, Switzerland
- Hérémence, Switzerland
- Riddes, Switzerland
- Saint-Martin, Switzerland
- Trient, Switzerland
- Vex, Switzerland

Esquel

- Aberystwyth, Wales, United Kingdom

== F ==
Florencio Varela

- Chizhou, China
- Isla Mujeres, Mexico

== G ==
General San Martín

- Alytus, Lithuania
- Civitanova Marche, Italy
- Maringá, Brazil
- São Bernardo do Campo, Brazil

== H ==
Hurlingham

- Montevideo, Uruguay

== L ==
Lanús

- Isla Mujeres, Mexico

Libertador San Martín

- Loma Linda, United States

Llambi Campbell

- La Cassa, Italy

Luján de Cuyo

- Bento Gonçalves, Brazil
- Mateh Yehuda, Israel

== M ==
Mar del Plata

- Bari, Italy
- Benito Juárez, Mexico
- A Coruña, Spain
- Fort Lauderdale, United States
- Isla Mujeres, Mexico
- Montevideo, Uruguay
- Rio de Janeiro, Brazil
- Saint Petersburg, Russia
- San Benedetto del Tronto, Italy
- Sorrento, Italy

Mendoza

- Nashville, United States
- Uriondo, Bolivia

== P ==
Paraná

- Artigas, Uruguay
- Leonforte, Italy
- Rehovot, Israel
- Santiago de Cuba, Cuba

La Plata

- Anghiari, Italy
- Asunción, Paraguay
- Beersheba, Israel
- Bologna, Italy
- Boulogne-sur-Mer, France
- Chengdu, China
- Concepción, Chile
- Coro, Venezuela
- Jiujiang, China
- Louisville, United States
- Maldonado, Uruguay
- Montevideo, Uruguay
- Porto Alegre, Brazil
- Santa Cruz de la Sierra, Bolivia
- Shenyang, China
- Sucre, Bolivia
- Tabarre, Haiti
- Zacatecas, Mexico
- Zaragoza, Spain

== Q ==
Quilmes

- Canoas, Brazil
- Colonia del Sacramento, Uruguay
- Isla Mujeres, Mexico
- Nanchang, China
- San Mauro Castelverde, Italy

== R ==
Rafaela

- Fossano, Italy
- Sigmaringendorf, Germany

Ramona

- Villanova Canavese, Italy

Río Cuarto

- Abilene, United States
- Asunción, Paraguay
- La Carolina, Argentina
- Chillán, Chile
- San Rafael, Argentina
- Villa de Merlo, Argentina
- Vinaròs, Spain

Rosario

- Alessandria, Italy
- Almaty, Kazakhstan
- Asunción, Paraguay
- Bilbao, Spain
- Caracas, Venezuela
- Cuenca, Ecuador
- Dakar, Senegal
- Haifa, Israel
- Imperia, Italy
- Kuwait City, Kuwait
- Manizales, Colombia
- Medellín, Colombia
- Monterrey, Mexico
- Montevideo, Uruguay
- Piraeus, Greece
- Pisco, Peru
- Porto Alegre, Brazil
- Shanghai, China
- Santa Clara, Cuba
- Santa Cruz de la Sierra, Bolivia
- Santiago de Cuba, Cuba
- Santo Domingo, Dominican Republic
- St. Louis, United States
- Turin, Italy
- Valparaíso, Chile

Rosario de Lerma

- Lerma, Mexico

== S ==
Salta

- Cuenca, Ecuador
- Huelva, Spain

San Isidro

- Coral Gables, United States
- Herzliya, Israel

San José de Metán

- Brusino Arsizio, Switzerland
- Tarija, Bolivia

San Juan

- Coquimbo, Chile
- Isla Mujeres, Mexico
- Nerja, Spain
- Santa Catarina, Brazil
- La Serena, Chile
- Vicuña, Chile
- Xaló, Spain

San Justo

- Arluno, Italy

San Miguel de Tucumán

- Concepción, Chile
- Erfurt, Germany
- Nof HaGalil, Israel
- Sucre, Bolivia
- Santa Cruz de la Sierra, Bolivia

Santa Fe

- Braga, Portugal
- Cuneo, Italy
- Montevideo, Uruguay
- Santa Fe, Spain

Sunchales

- Arrasate/Mondragón, Spain
- Nova Petrópolis, Brazil
- Rivarolo Canavese, Italy
