= Holbox Aerodrome =

Holbox Airstrip Aeropuerto de Holbox
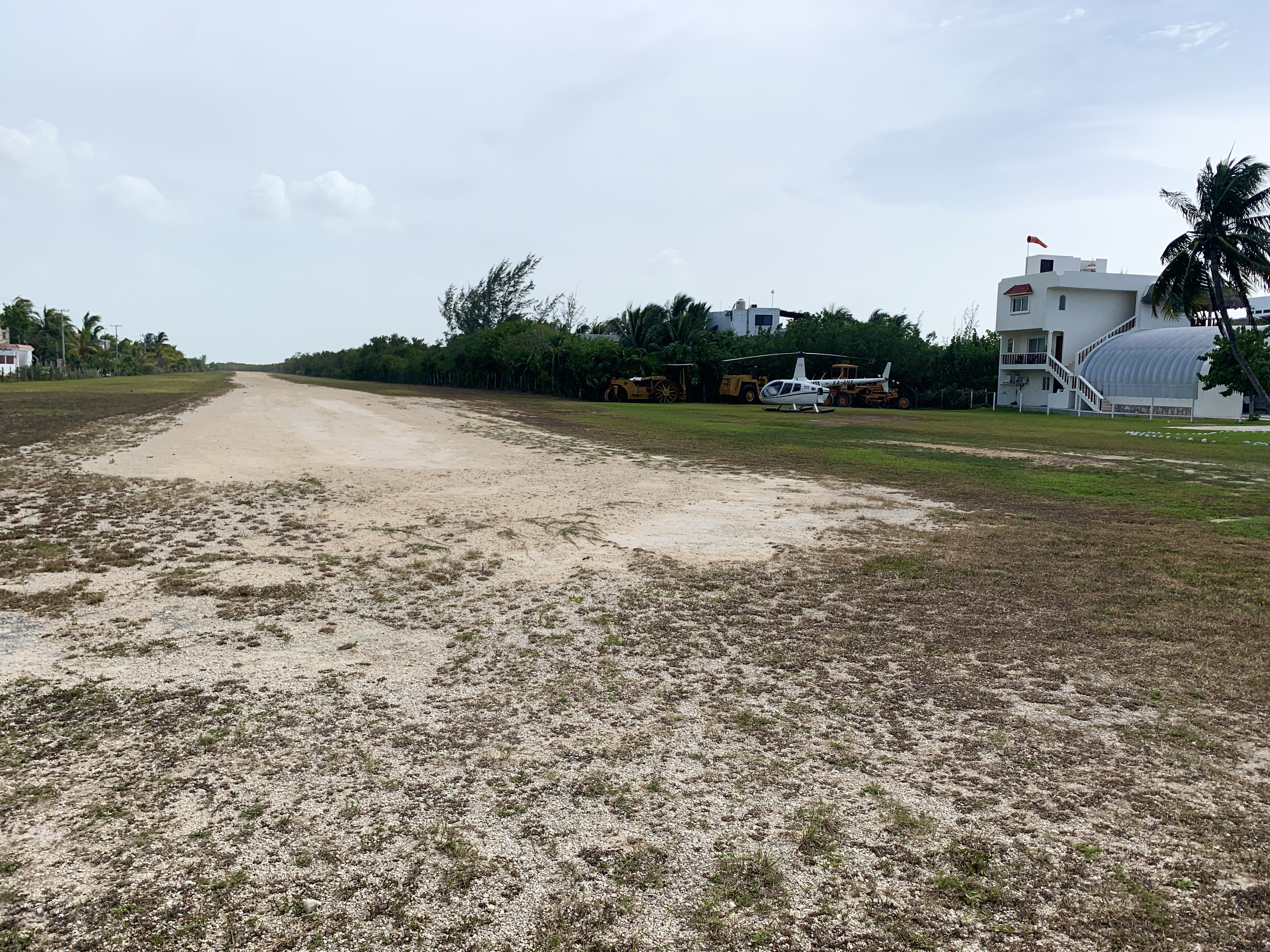
- IATA: none; ICAO: none

Summary
- Airport type: Private
- Serves: Holbox, Quintana Roo, Mexico
- Location: Lázaro Cárdenas, Quintana Roo, Mexico
- Time zone: EST (UTC-05:00)
- Elevation AMSL: 3 m / 10 ft
- Coordinates: 21°31′11″N 87°22′58″W

Map
- Location of the airport in Quintana Roo HOL (Mexico)

Runways
| Direction | Length | | Surface |
| Direction | m | ft | Surface |
|---|---|---|---|
| 02/20 | 660 | 2,165 | Dirt |

Statistics (2023)
- Total passengers: N/A
- Ranking in Mexico: N/A
- Source: Agencia Federal de Aviación Civil

Holbox Airstrip (Spanish: Aeropuerto de Holbox) (DGAC: HOL) is a private airstrip located on Isla Holbox, Quintana Roo, Mexico. It serves air traffic for the town of Holbox, supporting general aviation and air taxi activities. It does not provide scheduled passenger public flights. Charter airline Aerosaab offers private flights from Cancun, Isla Mujeres, Cozumel, and Playa del Carmen. The nearest airport that serves commercial flights is Cancun International Airport.

Situated at an elevation of 5 metres (16 ft) above mean sea level, the airport features a single soil runway, designated as 02/20, measuring 660 by 10 metres (2,165 by 33 ft). Adjacent facilities include parking positions for up to 5 light twin-engine aircraft and a small open-air passenger terminal.

== Incidents ==
On April 14, 2013, a Cessna 177 aircraft with registration XB-IHT that was preparing to make a flight between Holbox Aerodrome and Mérida International Airport encountered crosswinds during its takeoff run, causing the pilot to lose control of the aircraft and eventually collapsed, causing major damage to the aircraft, however, the pilot and the 3 passengers were uninjured. Before the accident, the DGAC issued recommendations about signaling improvements at the aerodrome with more than one wind cone, in addition to improving pilot training.

On July 25, 2020, a Cessna 208B Grand Caravan aircraft with registration XA-FTG operated by AX Transporter that was covering a flight between Cancun Airport and Holbox Aerodrome impacted the perimeter fence of a softball field after failing to brake properly at the aerodrome. The 2 crew members and the 5 passengers were uninjured. The aircraft sustained substantial damage.

On March 30, 2021, a Cessna T206H Stationair TC aircraft with registration XA-UPC operated by XOMEX Transportes Aéreos, which was making a local exhibition flight for a private event, stalled and later crashed into Laguna Nichupté, killing both pilots and the two passengers survived.

== See also ==
- List of the busiest airports in Mexico
- List of airports in Mexico
- List of airports by ICAO code: M
- List of busiest airports in North America
- List of the busiest airports in Latin America
- Transportation in Mexico
- Tourism in Mexico
- List of beaches in Mexico
- Riviera Maya
- Isla Mujeres
- Caribbean Sea
- Cancun International Airport
