= San Antonio-Castellanos =

Urban conurbation in Santa Fe Province, Argentina

- Urban conurbation
- Location of San Antonio-Castellanos San Antonio-Castellanos (Argentina)
- Coordinates: 31°12′39″S 61°43′30″W
- Country: Argentina
- Province: Santa Fe
- Department: Castellanos

Population (2010)
  - Total: 752
- Time zone: UTC−3 (ART)
- CPA base: S2301

San Antonio-Castellanos is an urban conurbation the Castellanos Department, in Santa Fe Province in northeastern Argentina. It extends between the localities of San Antonio and Castellanos.

== Population ==
Considered as an urban agglomeration by INDEC since 2001, according to the results of the 2010 census, San Antonio-Castellanos had a population 752 inhabitants, which represented an increase compared to the previous census that had 723 inhabitants.

Locality	Department	2010 Census	2001 Census	1991 Census
San Antonio	Castellanos	412	409	456
Castellanos	Castellanos	340	314	353
Total		752	723	809
