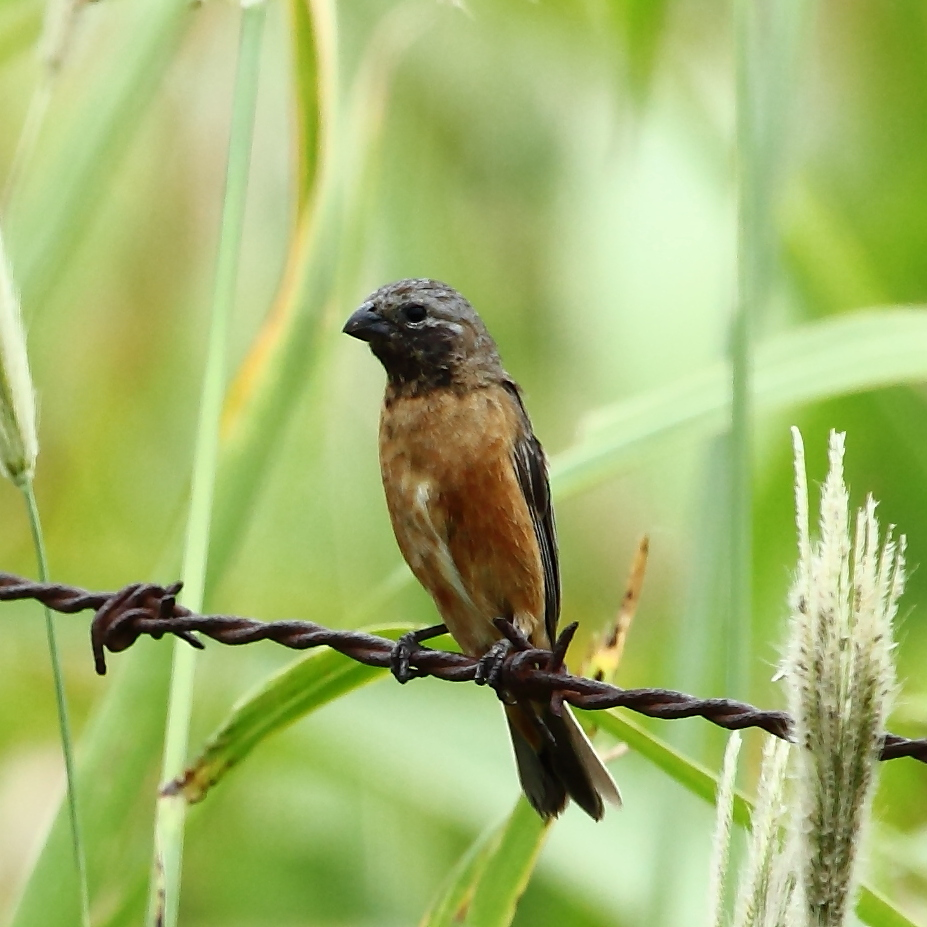
- Male at Ataliva, Santa Fe Province, Argentina

Conservation status
- Near Threatened (IUCN 3.1)

Scientific classification
- Kingdom: Animalia
- Phylum: Chordata
- Class: Aves
- Order: Passeriformes
- Family: Thraupidae
- Genus: Sporophila
- Species: S. ruficollis

Binomial name
- Sporophila ruficollis Cabanis, 1851
- Breeding Non-Breeding

= Dark-throated seedeater =

Species of bird

The dark-throated seedeater (Sporophila ruficollis) is a Near Threatened species of bird in the family Thraupidae, the tanagers and allies. It is found in Argentina, Bolivia, Brazil, Paraguay, Uruguay, and as a vagrant to Peru.

== Taxonomy and systematics ==
The dark-throated seedeater has a somewhat complicated taxonomic history. It was formally described in 1851 with its current binomial Sporophila ruficollis. The genus was then in the family Fringillidae. By 1970 the genus Sporophila had been reassigned to the family Emberizidae. Based on studies published between 1988 and 2011, beginning in 2012 Sporophila was moved to the tanager family Thraupidae.

The dark-throated seedeater is monotypic.

== Description ==
The dark-throated seedeater is 10 to 11 cm (3.9 to 4.3 in) long and weighs 7 to 9.7 g (0.25 to 0.34 oz). It is one of the smallest of its genus. It has a smallish bill with a rounded culmen. The species is sexually dimorphic. Adult males have a gray crown and nape that give a "helmeted" appearance; the rest of their face is blackish brown. Their mantle and upper back are gray and their lower back and rump are rufous or dark cinnamon. Their tail is blackish with gray edges on the outer feathers. Their wings are blackish with gray-brown edges on the greater coverts and tertials. Their wing's primaries have white bases that show as a patch on the folded wing. Their throat and upper breast are blackish brown and the rest of their underparts rufous. (Note: A rare color morph has the blackish brown of the throat continue around the neck as a "collar" and a fully rufous back.) Females have a mostly warm brown head with a buff face. Their upperparts are also warm brown and their tail is darker brown. Their wings are darker brown with sandy edges on the coverts and tertials and a small whitish primary patch like the male's. Their underparts are warm buff that is palest on the belly. Both sexes have a dark brown iris. Males have a dark gray to black bill and legs; females have a dark horn-colored to blackish bill and blackish legs. Juveniles resemble adult females.

== Distribution and habitat ==
In their 2025 versions AviList and the Clements taxonomy provide a detailed description of the dark-throated seedeater's range: "southeastern Bolivia (southeastern Tarija), southwestern Brazil (western Mato Grosso do Sul, southern Rio Grande do Sul), Paraguay, northern Argentina (Salta eastward to Corrientes, southward to Tucumán, northern Córdoba and northern Buenos Aires), and western Uruguay; non-breeding to northern and eastern Bolivia and central and southern Brazil (eastward to Minas Gerais, and southward to Rio Grande do Sul)". In addition, the South American Classification Committee has records of the species as a vagrant in Peru.

The dark-throated seedeater inhabits tall grasslands, especially those long untouched by humans, and similar landscapes such as roadsides that have not been mowed. It is sometimes near damp areas but is less often connected to water than some others of its genus. In Argentina it also is found in scrubbier areas and in its non-breeding range in grassy Cerrado. In elevation it ranges from sea level to 1,200 m (3,900 ft).

== Behavior ==
=== Movement ===
The dark-throated seedeater is mostly migratory: "good numbers of this species spend winter months in [the] Cerrado region of Mato Grosso".

=== Feeding ===
The dark-throated seedeater feeds on grass seeds. It typically feeds while clinging to stems. It forages in small groups and often in larger ones that include other seed-eating species.

=== Breeding ===
The dark-throated seedeater breeds between December and February. Its nest is a cup made from dried grass, other vegetation, and spider web. It is typically in low vegetation at about 0.5 m (1.5 ft) above the ground. The clutch is two or three eggs that are whitish with darker markings. The incubation period, time to fledging, and details of parental care are not known.

=== Vocalization ===
The dark-throated seedeater's song is "sweet and mellow, a series of descending whistles, sometimes with a more complex series of notes towards end...pheeeh weeo pweeo or phee phee feeo pt-pheeo phwit". Its calls "include quiet tsiew, jep or tsilew notes".

== Status ==
The IUCN has assessed the dark-throated seedeater as Near Threatened. Its population size is not known and is believed to be decreasing. "There has been extensive conversion of grasslands for agriculture and Eucalyptus and Pinus spp. plantations, especially in the south of its range. The use of pesticides and annual burning on adjacent agricultural land have detrimental effects on breeding sites. Habitat loss compounds the threat from trade by concentrating birds in a few sites easily accessible to trappers". It is considered generally uncommon to rare though fairly common to common in some areas.
