= Castellanos, Santa Fe =

Locality in Santa Fe Province, Argentina

Castellanos
- Locality
- Location of Castellanos Castellanos (Argentina)
- Coordinates: 31°12′29″S 61°43′26″W
- Country: Argentina
- Province: Santa Fe
- Department: Castellanos

Government
  - Communal President: Audino Diego Osvaldo (Juntos por el Cambio-PRO)

Population (2010)
  - Total: 340
- Time zone: UTC−3 (ART)
- CPA base: S2301

Castellanos is a locality in Santa Fe Province in northeastern Argentina. It is located 1 km (0.62 mi) north of Provincial Route 70, next to San Antonio with which it is conurbated, forming the urban conurbation of San Antonio-Castellanos.

Castellanos was founded in 1885. It has a school.
