= Osasio =

- Comune
- Comune di Osasio
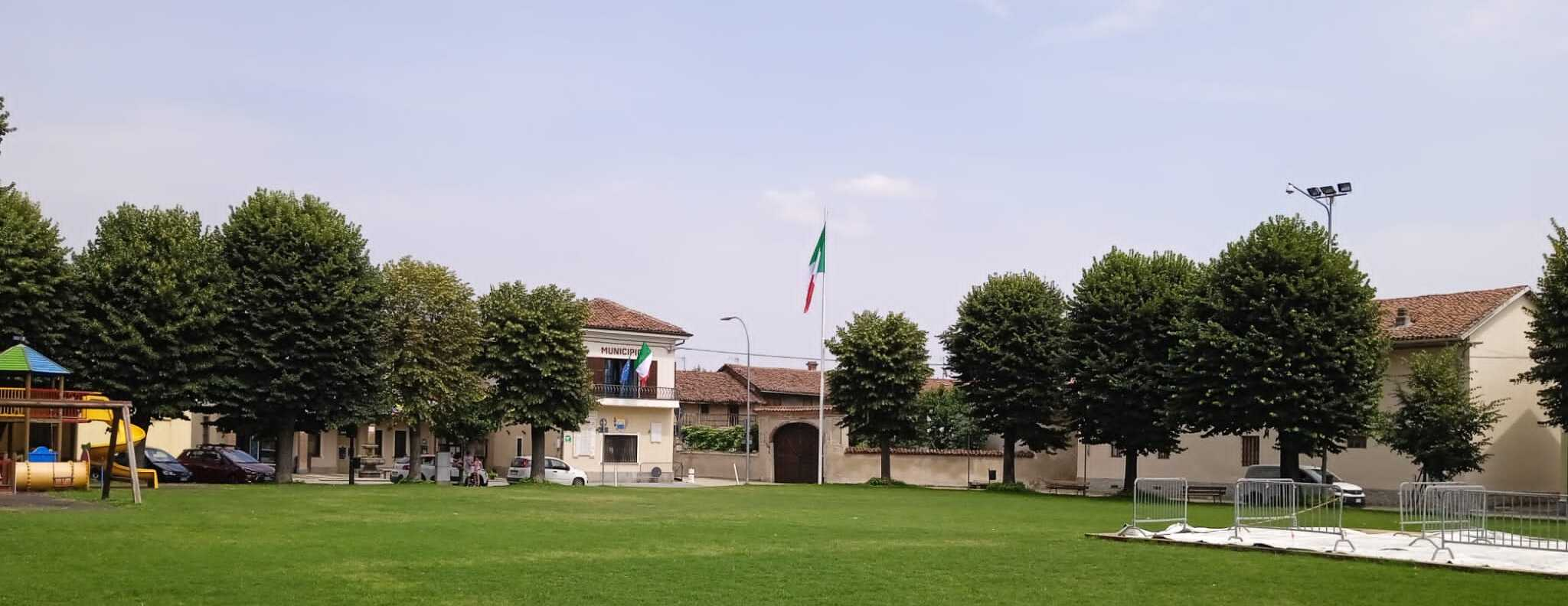

- Coat of arms

- Location within Italy Location within Piedmont
- Coordinates: 44°52′N 7°36′E
- Country: Italy
- Region: Piedmont
- Metropolitan city: Turin (TO)

Government
  - Mayor: Silvio Cerutti

Area
  - Total: 4.58 km^{2} (1.77 sq mi)
- Elevation: 241 m (791 ft)

Population (1-1-2017)
  - Total: 928
  - Density: 203/km^{2} (525/sq mi)
- Demonym: Osasiese(i)
- Time zone: UTC+1 (CET)
  - Summer (DST): UTC+2 (CEST)
- Postal code: 10040
- Dialing code: 011
- Patron saint: Holy Trinity
- Website: Official website

Osasio is a comune (municipality) in the Metropolitan City of Turin in the Italian region Piedmont, located about 25 km (16 mi) southwest of Turin.

Osasio borders the following municipalities: Castagnole Piemonte, Virle Piemonte, Carignano, Pancalieri, and Lombriasco.
