= San Antonio, Santa Fe =

Locality in Santa Fe Province, Argentina

San Antonio
- Locality
- Location of San Antonio San Antonio (Argentina)
- Coordinates: 31°12′40″S 61°43′30″W
- Country: Argentina
- Province: Santa Fe
- Department: Castellanos

Government
  - Communal President: Previotto Mauro Damián

Population (2010)
  - Total: 412
- Time zone: UTC−3 (ART)
- CPA base: S2301

San Antonio is a locality in Santa Fe Province in northeastern Argentina. It is located on Provincial Route 70, separated from Castellanos by a street. These two localities form the urban conurbation of San Antonio-Castellanos.

== History ==
There is a discrepancy regarding the date of foundation, being situated between 1892 and 1893, for which reason the year 1894 in which the layout was approved is taken as the date of foundation. The foundation of San Antonio is due to Eduardo Saguier's desire to found a colony, for which he appointed Juan Beapuy as administrator. In 1903 the commune was established. It is estimated that the name of the locality is due to the founder's devotion to Saint Anthony of Padua. It is a dairy production area. In 2003, the drinking water network was inaugurated. It has a sports institution.
