= Playa del Carmen Airport =

Playa del Carmen National Airport Aeropuerto Nacional de Playa del Carmen
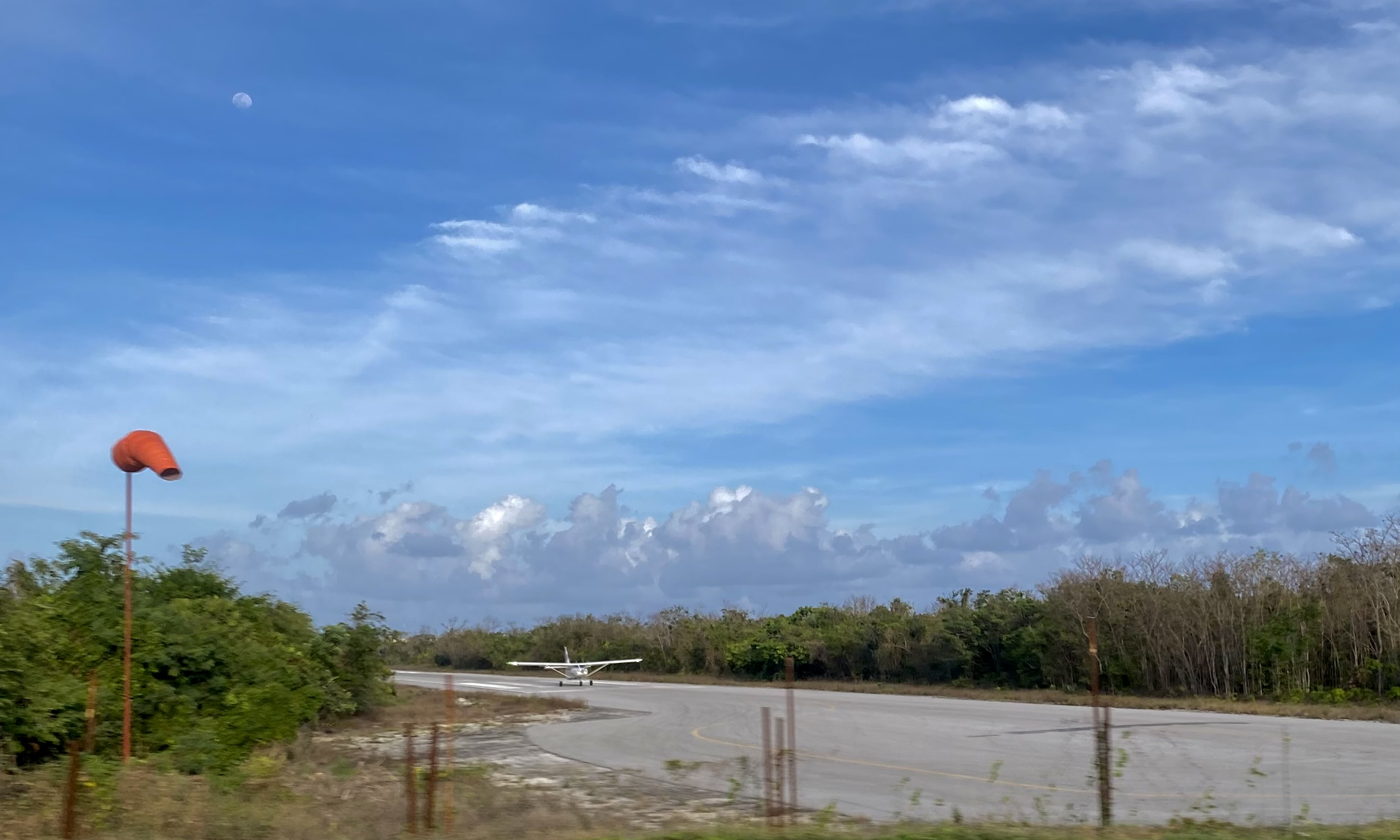
- Playa del Carmen Airport

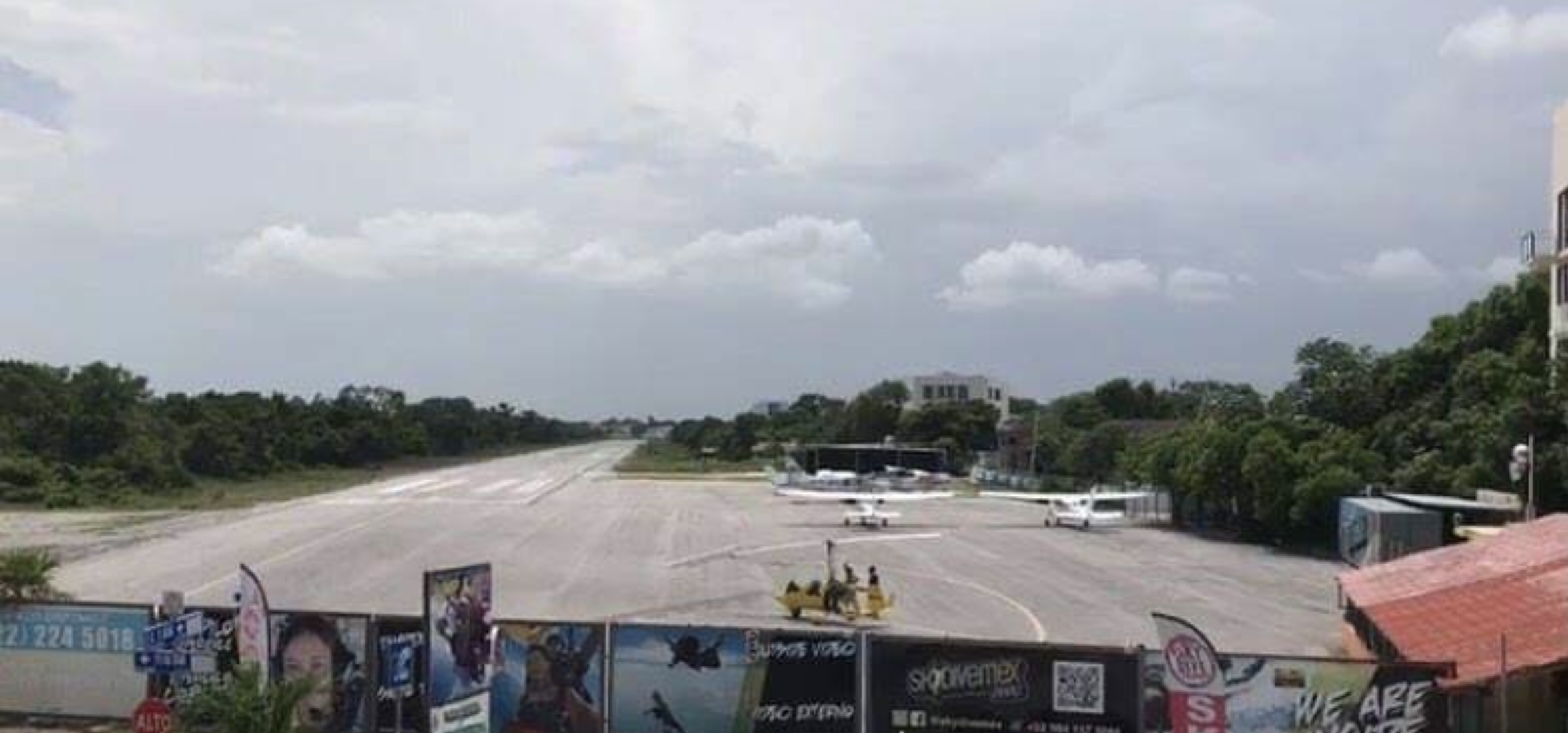
- IATA: PCM; ICAO: MMPY; LID: PCE

Summary
- Operator: VIP Servicios Aéreos Ejecutivos S.A. de C.V.
- Serves: Playa del Carmen
- Elevation AMSL: 20 ft / 6 m
- Coordinates: 20°37′22″N 087°04′56″W
- Website: www.vipsaesa.com/PCM

Map
- Location of the airport in Quintana Roo PCM (Mexico)

Runways
Direction	Length		Surface
Direction	ft	m	Surface
11/29	2,805	855	Asphalt

Statistics (2024)
- Total Passengers: 6,965
- Agencia Federal de Aviación Civil

Playa del Carmen Airport (IATA: PCM, ICAO: MMPY, AFAC: PCE), is an airport located in the city of Playa del Carmen, Quintana Roo, Mexico. There is little activity at the airport, and its runway of just a few hundred meters receives only small and medium-sized planes.

== History and facilities ==
The first airline to establish itself at the Playa del Carmen Airport was Aerosaab in April 1993, operating direct flights between Playa del Carmen Airport and Cozumel Airport, continuing to date with the same route in a non-regular passenger transport service, as well as to the Holbox Aerodrome, which is managed by the same company.

The aerodrome is located on a 16.5 hectares plot of land (40.8 acres), it has a runway 855 meters (2,805 feet) long and 15 meters (45 feet) wide with a turning drop at head 11, an aviation platform of 4,600 square meters (49,500 sq ft), hangars and a terminal building.

During 2021, the airport received 12,621 passengers.

== Statistics ==
=== Annual Traffic ===
Passenger statistics at Playa del Carmen
Year	Total Passengers	change %	Air operations	change %
2020	5,800	Steady	4,414	Steady
2021	12,621	▲117.6%	10,082	▲128.41%
2022	12,621	0%	10,602	▲5.16%
2023	8,454	▼33.02%	7,071	▼33.31%
2024	6,965	▼17.61%	5,199	▼26.47%
