= Vip Saesa =

- Vipsaesa S.A. de C.V.
- Predecessor: V.I.P. Servicios Aéreos Ejecutivos S.A. de C.V.
- Established: May 26, 1994; 32 years ago
- Type: Public limited company Mixed-ownership enterprise
- Tax ID no.: RFC: VSA-940526-H49
- Headquarters: Calle Juan Villanueva 409 Col. Campestre 77030
- Location: Chetumal, Quintana Roo, Mexico
- Services: Airport Services charter flights
- Owner: 48% Quintana Roo government 52% private
- General Director: CAPT. Erik Meraz Palma
- Website: vipsaesa.com

VIP Servicios Aéreos Ejecutivos S. A. or VIP Saesa is a mixed company dedicated to non-scheduled air transport services in Quintana Roo and to the maintenance and administration of some airfields within the state.

== Background ==
The company was founded in 1994 as a private enterprise. Between 1995 and 1996, the Government of the State of Quintana Roo purchased 48 shares of the company and currently manages and maintains the airports of Felipe Carrillo Puerto, Isla Mujeres, Kohunlich, Mahahual, Playa del Carmen, Punta Pulticub, and X-calak; Vip Saesa also counts with a fleet of 5 aircraft: Beechcraft King Air C-90 (XA-ROO), Bell 407 (XC-FIP), Cirrus SR22 (XA-UTR), Piper PA-31 Navajo (XA-THX) and Piper PA-34 Seneca (XC-HEW).

The company has been involved in scandals related to excessive use of public money, since in 2012 VIP Saesa spent a budget of 206 million 103 thousand pesos from the Quintana Roo treasury, closing that year with losses of 649 thousand 384 pesos and 42 cents and in the first quarter of 2015, the government of the State of Quintana Roo spent 56 million 496 thousand 556 pesos for aircraft rental.
