= Castellanos Department =

- Department
- Flag

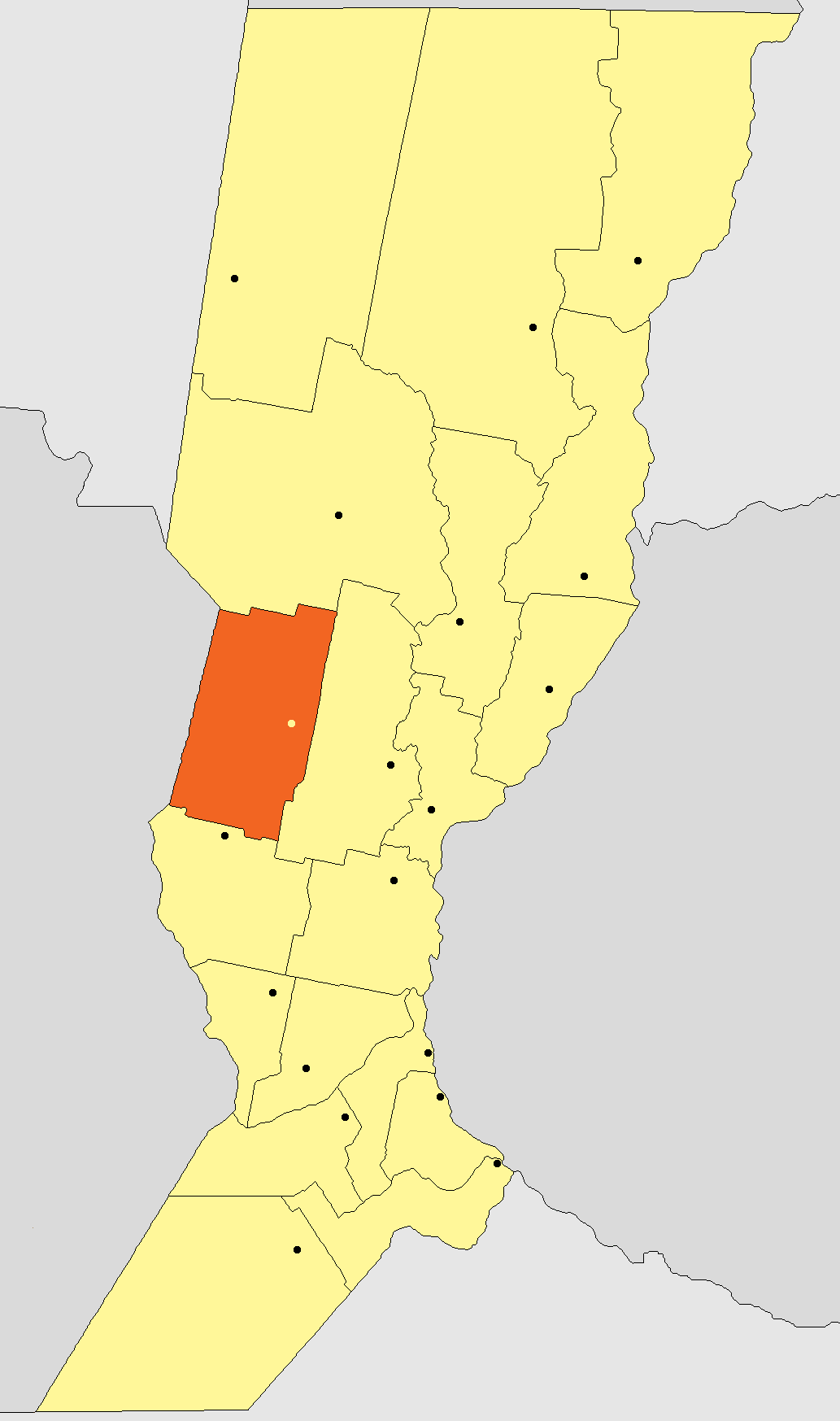
- Location of Castellanos Department within Santa Fe Province
- Coordinates: 31°16′S 61°29′W
- Country: Argentina
- Province: Santa Fe
- Head town: Rafaela

Area
  - Total: 6,600 km^{2} (2,500 sq mi)

Population
  - Total: 162,165
  - Density: 25/km^{2} (64/sq mi)
- Time zone: UTC-3 (ART)

The Castellanos Department (in Spanish, Departamento Castellanos) is an administrative subdivision (departamento) of the province of Santa Fe, Argentina. It is located in the center-west of the province. It has about 162,000 inhabitants as per the 2001 census [INDEC]. Its head town is the city of Rafaela (population 84,000).

Its neighbouring departments are San Cristóbal in the north, Las Colonias in the east, and San Martín in the south. The western limit is the border with the province of Córdoba.

The towns and cities in this department are (in alphabetical order): Angélica, Ataliva, Aurelia, Bauer y Sigel, Bella Italia, Colonia Bicha, Castellanos, Colonia Aldao, Colonia Bigand, Colonia Cello, Colonia Iturraspe, Colonia Margarita, Colonia Raquel, Coronel Fraga, Egusquiza, Esmeralda, Estación Clucellas, Eusebia y Carolina, Eustolia, Fidela, Frontera, Galisteo, Garibaldi, Hugentobler, Humberto Primo, Josefina, Lehmann, María Juana, Mauá, Plaza Clucellas, Presidente Roca, Pueblo Marini, Rafaela, Ramona, Saguier, San Antonio, San Vicente, Santa Clara de Saguier, Sunchales, Susana, Tacural, Tacurales, Vila, Villa San José, Virginia, Zenón Pereyra.
