= Isla Mujeres Municipality =

Isla Mujeres
- Municipality
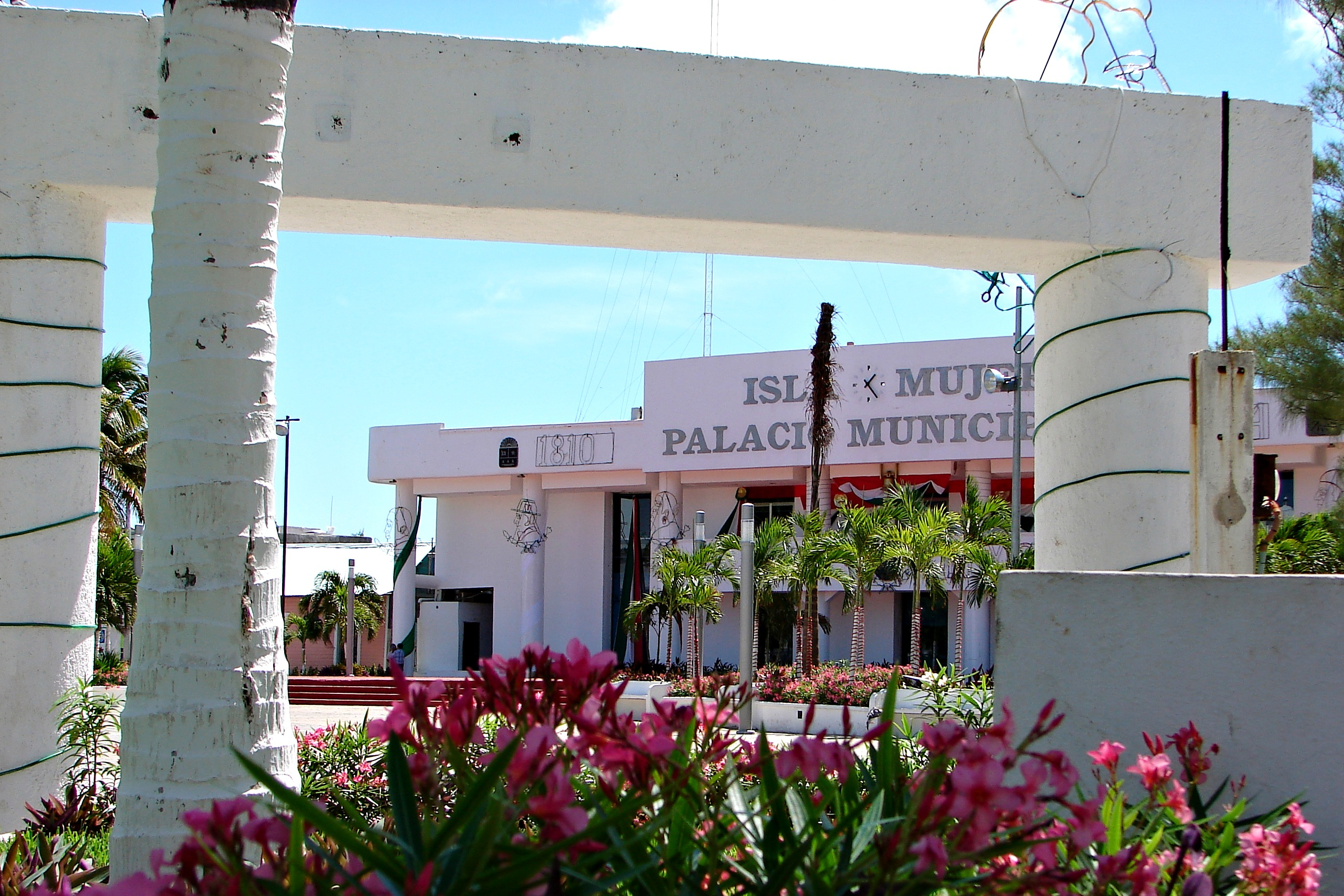
- Municipal hall on Isla Mujeres

- Flag

- Location of the Municipality in the State

- Location within Mexico
- Coordinates: 21°14′N 86°44′W
- Country: Mexico
- State: Quintana Roo
- Municipal seat: Isla Mujeres

Government
  - Municipal President: Hugo Sánchez Montalvo

Area
  - Municipality: 1,100 km^{2} (420 sq mi)
- Elevation: 1 m (3.3 ft)

Population (2010, 2019)
  - Municipality: 22,686
  - Urban: 15,295
- Time zone: UTC−5 (Southeastern Time Zone)
- INEGI Code: 23003
- Website: www.islamujeres.gob.mx

Isla Mujeres (Spanish pronunciation: ['isla mu'xeɾes], Spanish for Island of the Women) is one of the eleven municipalities of the Mexican state of Quintana Roo, located on the Yucatán Peninsula. Most of the municipality is located on the mainland in the northeastern corner of the state. Its municipal seat, also called Isla Mujeres, is a small town on the island from which it takes its name. It is located about 13 kilometres (8.1 mi) northeast of Cancún in the Caribbean Sea, and it is the easternmost municipal seat in Mexico. As of the 2010, 2019 census, the town had a population of 22,686 inhabitants.

== Towns and villages ==
The municipality consists of a total of 143 localities. The largest localities (cities, towns, and villages) are:

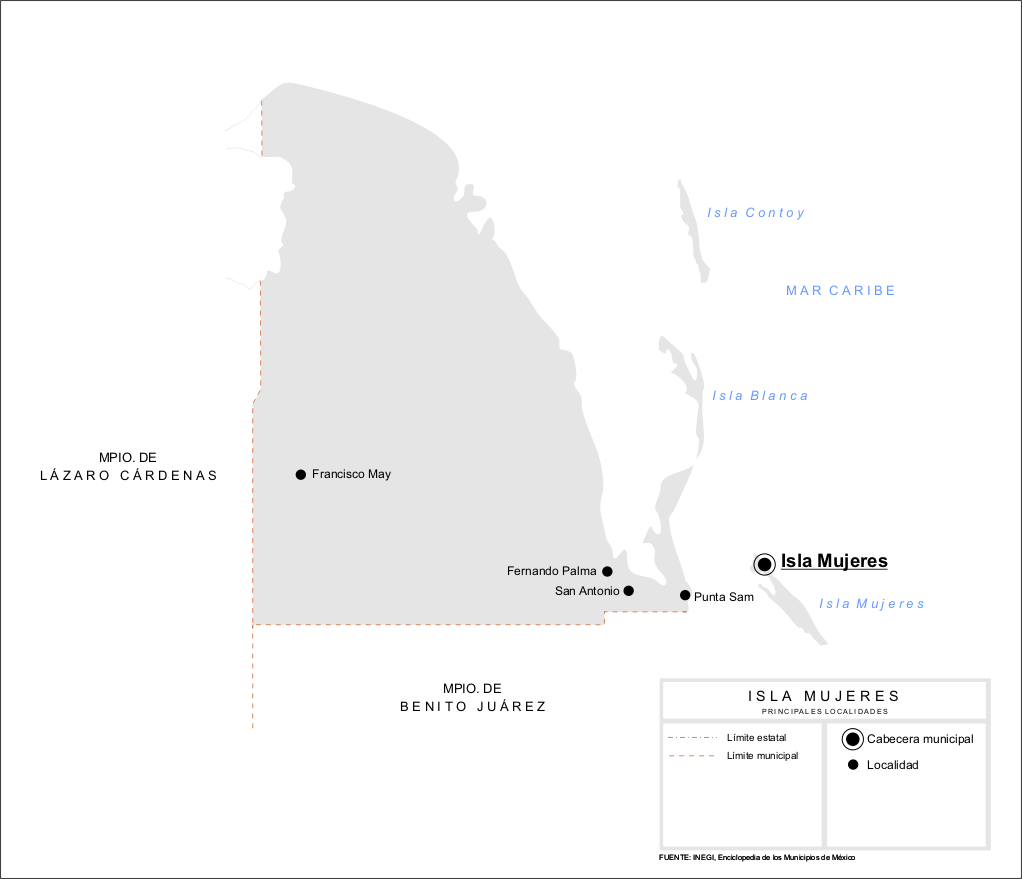
Map of the Municipality

Name	Population (2010 Census)
Isla Mujeres	12,642
Zona Urbana Ejido Isla Mujeres	2,653
Francisco May	223
Punta Sam	30
Total municipality	16,203

== Demographics ==
Historical population
Year	Pop.	±% p.a.
1995	8,750	—
2000	11,313	+5.27%
2005	13,315	+3.31%
2010	16,203	+4.00%
Source: INEGI Instituto Nacional de Estadística y Geografía
