= Isla Mujeres National Airport =

Airfield in Isla Mujeres, Quintana Roo, Mexico

Isla Mujeres National Airport Aeropuerto Nacional de Isla Mujeres
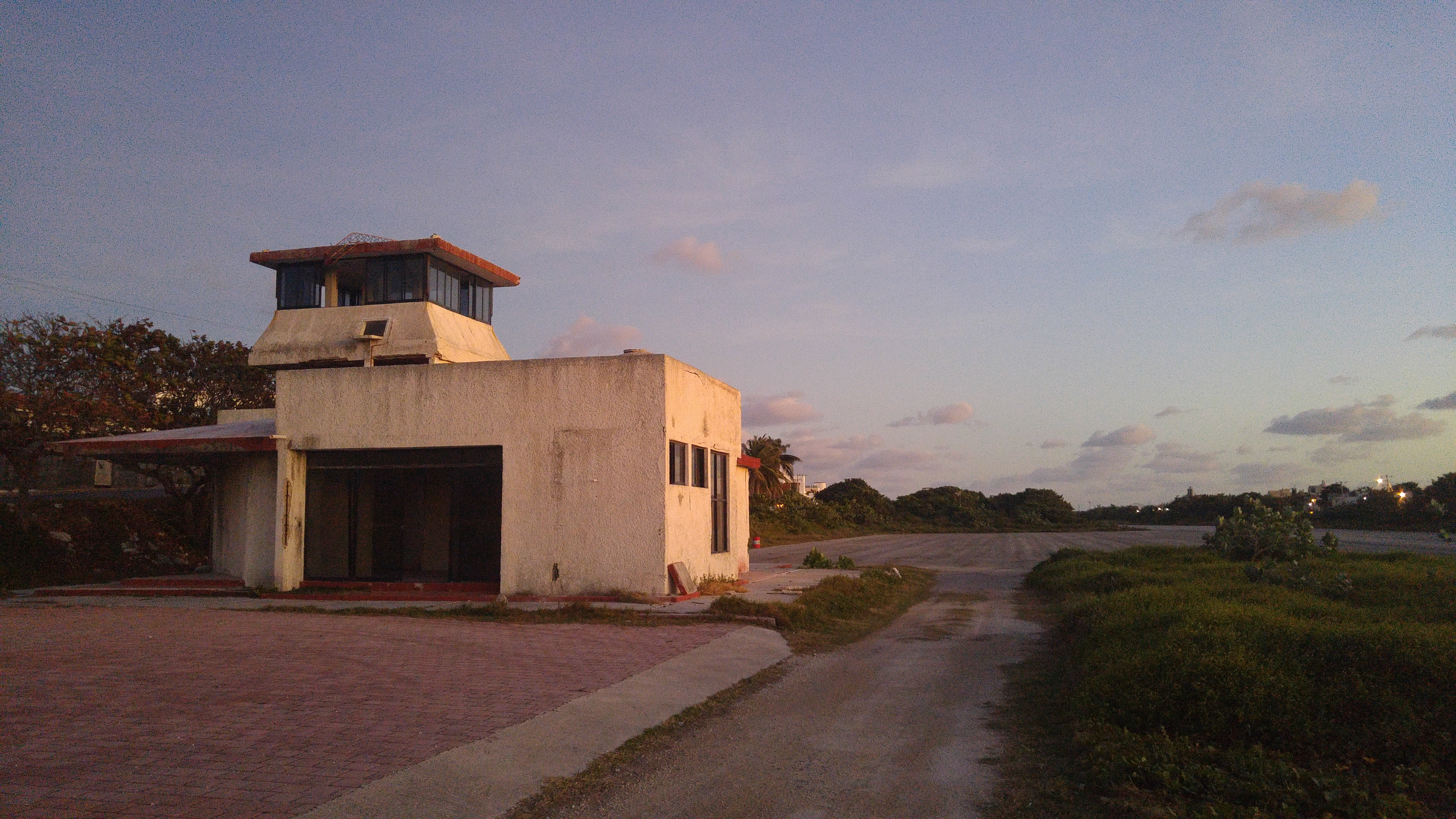
- IATA: ISJ; ICAO: MMIM; LID: IMU

Summary
- Airport type: Public / Naval
- Operator: SEMAR; Vip Saesa
- Serves: Isla Mujeres, Quintana Roo, Mexico
- Time zone: EST (UTC-05:00)
- Elevation AMSL: 5 m (16 ft)
- Coordinates: 21°14′42″N 86°44′23″W

Map
- Location of the airport in Quintana Roo ISJ (Mexico)

Runways
Direction	Length		Surface
Direction	m	ft	Surface
15/33	1,048	3,438	Asphalt

Statistics (2019)
- Total passengers: N/A
- Ranking in Mexico: N/A
- Source: Agencia Federal de Aviación Civil

Isla Mujeres National Airport (Spanish: Aeropuerto Nacional de Isla Mujeres) (IATA: ISJ, ICAO: MMIM) is an airstrip located on Isla Mujeres, Quintana Roo, Mexico. It serves air traffic for the town of Isla Mujeres, supporting general aviation activities. It does not provide scheduled passenger public flights. The nearest airport that serves commercial flights is Cancun International Airport.

Situated at an elevation of 5 metres (16 ft) above mean sea level, the airport features a single asphalt runway, designated as 15/33, measuring 1,050 by 23 metres (3,445 by 75 ft). Adjacent facilities include an apron with parking positions for small aircraft and a small terminal and control tower, which is currently abandoned and has been vandalized.

== See also ==
- List of the busiest airports in Mexico
- List of airports in Mexico
- List of airports by ICAO code: M
- List of busiest airports in North America
- List of the busiest airports in Latin America
- Transportation in Mexico
- Tourism in Mexico
- List of beaches in Mexico
- Riviera Maya
- Isla Mujeres
- Caribbean Sea
- Cancun International Airport
