= Humberto Primo =

- Town
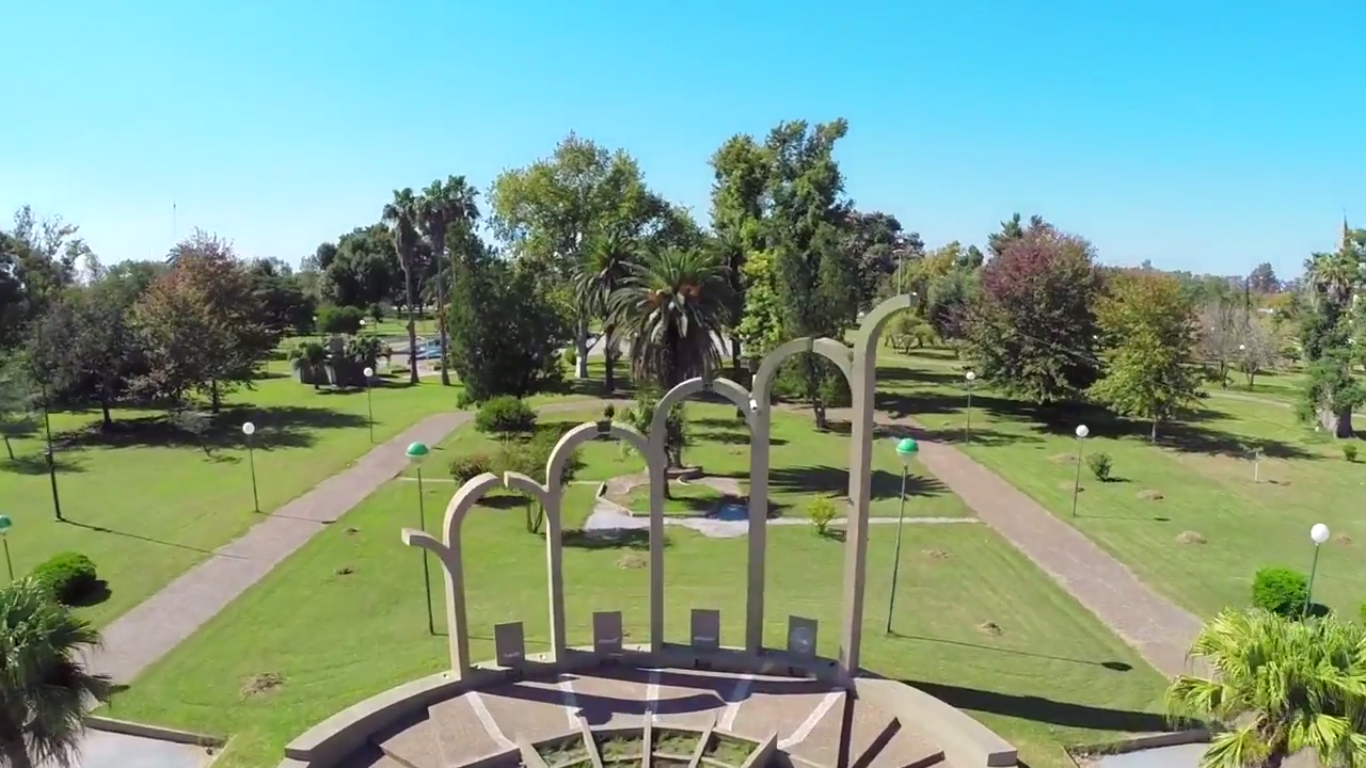

- Location within Santa Fe Province Location within Argentina
- Coordinates: 30°52′06″S 61°20′53″W
- Country: Argentina
- Province: Santa Fe
- Department: Castellanos
- Foundation: 7 October 1884
- Elevation: 77 m (253 ft)

Population (2010)
  - Total: 4,751
- Time zone: UTC−3 (ART)

Humberto Primo is a town located in Castellanos Department in the Santa Fe Province of Argentina. It is 165 km (103 mi) from the provincial capital Santa Fe, 303 km (188 mi) from Rosario, and 620 km (390 mi) from Buenos Aires.

== Twin towns ==
- Faule, Italy
