= Ramona, Santa Fe =

Ramona
- Locality
- Location within Santa Fe Province Location within Argentina
- Coordinates: 31°06′00″S 61°53′00″W
- Country: Argentina
- Province: Santa Fe
- Department: Castellanos

Area
  - Total: 98 km^{2} (38 sq mi)
- Elevation: 98 m (322 ft)

Population (2010)
  - Total: 1,694
  - Density: 17/km^{2} (45/sq mi)
- Time zone: UTC−3 (ART)

Ramona is a locality located in the Castellanos Department in the Santa Fe Province, Argentina. It is 50 km (31 mi) west of the city of Rafaela.

== Twin Town ==
- Villanova Canavese, Italy
