= Faule =

- Comune
- Comune di Faule
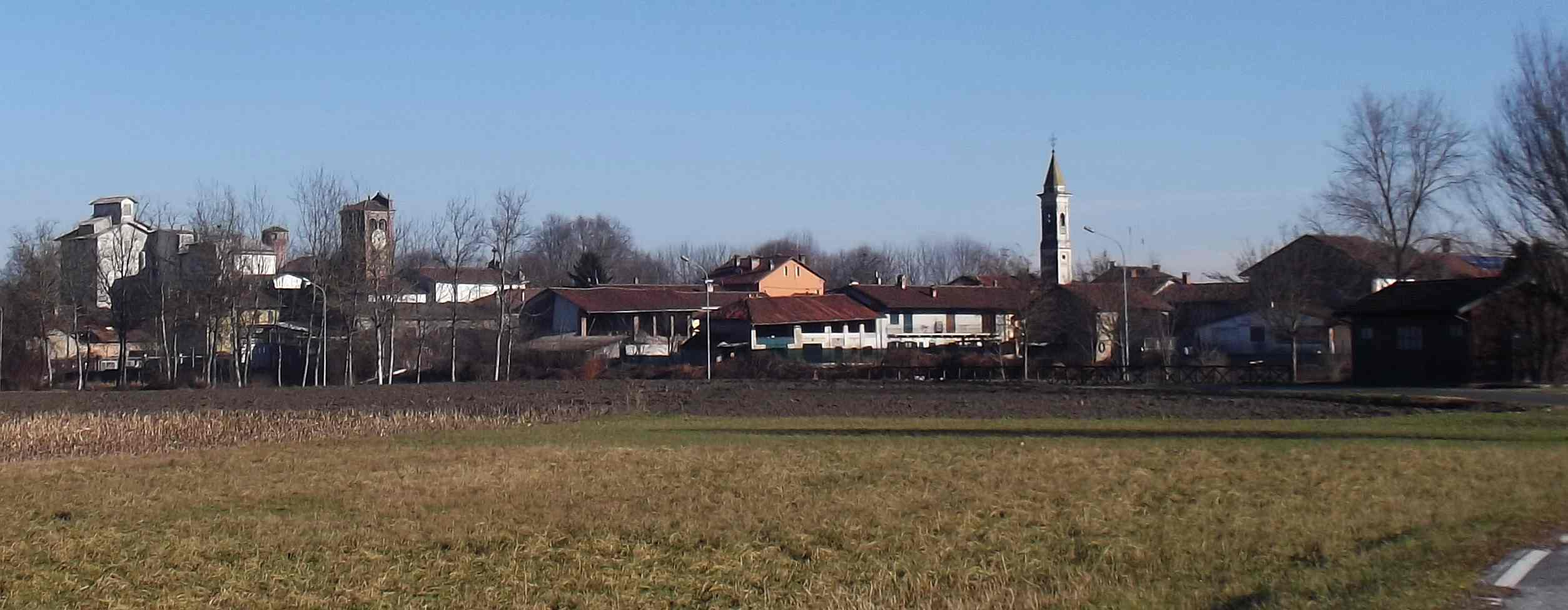
- Faule's panorama with Villafranca Piemonte street

- Coat of arms

- Location within Italy Location within Piedmont
- Coordinates: 44°48′N 7°35′E
- Country: Italy
- Region: Piedmont
- Province: Cuneo (CN)
- Frazioni: Cascinetta, Motta, Porto

Government
  - Mayor: Giuseppe Scarafia (Civic List)

Area
  - Total: 6.86 km^{2} (2.65 sq mi)
- Elevation: 246 m (807 ft)

Population (3-3-2017)
  - Total: 493
  - Density: 71.9/km^{2} (186/sq mi)
- Demonym: Faulese(i)
- Time zone: UTC+1 (CET)
  - Summer (DST): UTC+2 (CEST)
- Postal code: 12030
- Dialing code: 011
- Website: Official website

Faule is a comune (municipality) in the Province of Cuneo in the Italian region Piedmont, located about 30 kilometres (19 mi) southwest of Turin and about 45 kilometres (28 mi) north of Cuneo, near the Po River. The city is famous for the piedmontais traditional food "Bagna Cauda"

It is home to a 10th-century castle and to several medieval buildings.

== Twin towns ==
Faule is twinned with:

- Humberto Primo, Argentina (1997)
