= Isla Mujeres =

Island off the Yucatán Peninsula in Mexico

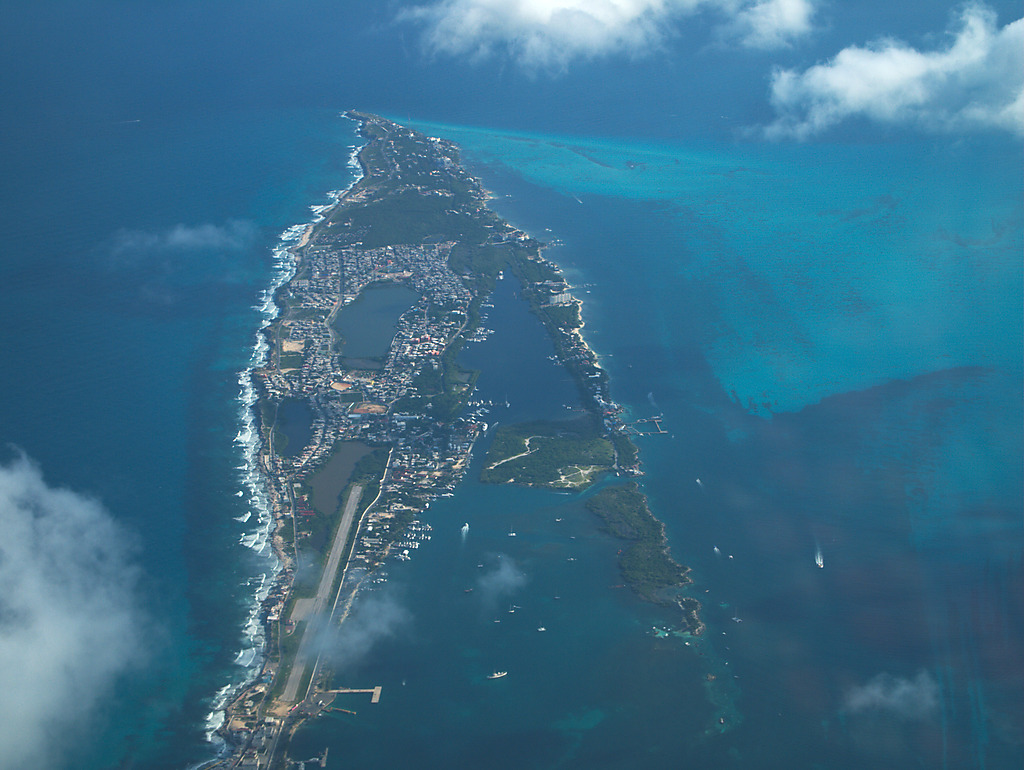
- Aerial view of southern portion of Isla Mujeres

- Location within Quintana Roo Location within Mexico
- Interactive map of Isla Mujeres

Geography
- Coordinates: 21°14′N 86°44′W
- Adjacent to: Gulf of Mexico, Caribbean Sea
- Length: 7 km (4.3 mi)
- Width: 0.65 km (0.404 mi)

Administration
- Mexico
- State: Quintana Roo
- Municipality: Isla Mujeres

Demographics
- Population: 12,642 (2010)

Isla Mujeres (Spanish pronunciation: ['isla mu'xeɾes], Spanish for "Women Island", formally "Isla de Mujeres") is an island where the Gulf of Mexico and the Caribbean Sea meet, about 13 kilometres (8.1 mi) off the Yucatán Peninsula coast in the State of Quintana Roo, Mexico. In the 2010 census, the namesake town on the island had a population of 12,642. The town is the seat of Isla Mujeres Municipality. It is located within the Eastern Standard Time Zone, which is UTC-5.

== History ==
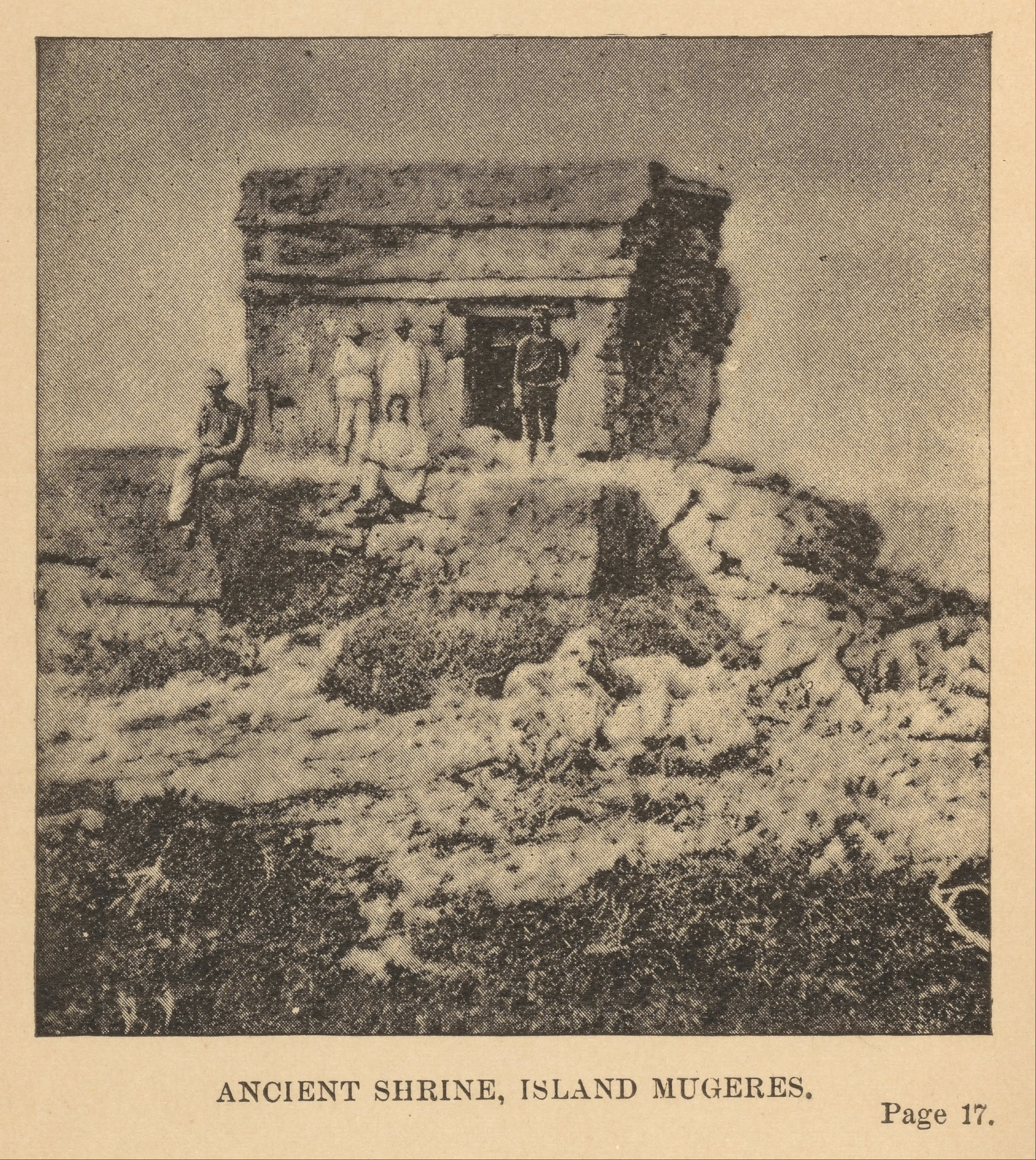
Former Maya ruins on Isla Mujeres

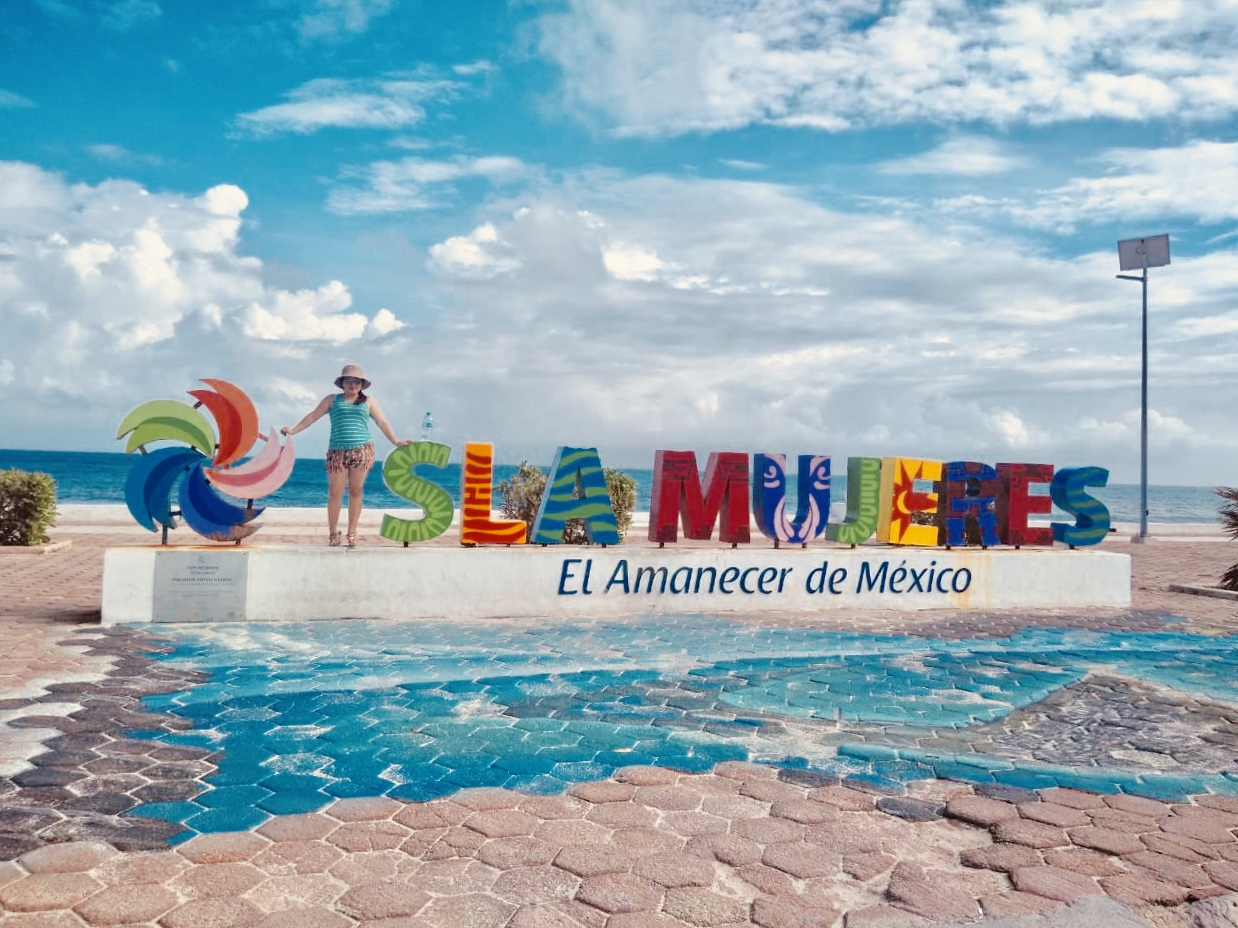
Isla Mujeres is among the smallest islands in the Caribbean.

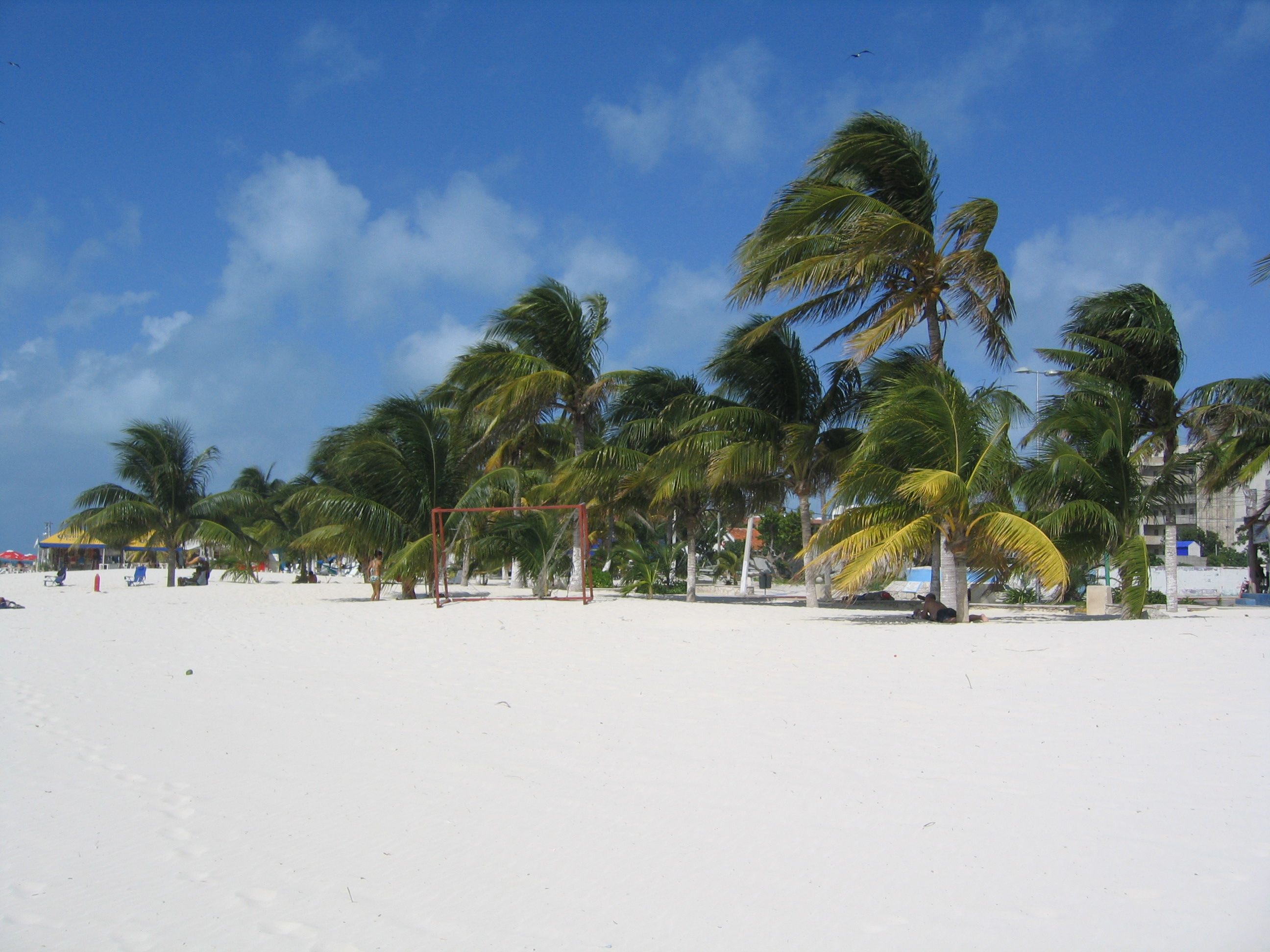
Isla Mujeres, Mexico, January 2007

In Pre-Columbian times, the island was sacred to Ixchel, the Maya goddess of childbirth and medicine. When the Spanish arrived in the 16th century they named it "Isla Mujeres" after the many images of goddesses. The first information available about Isla Mujeres is from between 564 and 1516, when it was part of the Maya province Ekab. There were four Maya provinces in the area of the modern state of Quintana Roo. The Maya exploited the salt the island produced in the salinas (small, interior lagoons), using it in food preservation and medicine and as a currency.

A temple to Ixchel stood in what is now Hacienda Mundaca (Mundaca Plantation). The island was also a favorite stopping place for pirates in the early 1800s. The shallow lagoon on the mainland side was a good place for sailors to sit out major storms, clean their hulls, and trade for salt. Pirates Henry Morgan, Jean Lafitte, and Hernán Mundaca spent time there. Mundaca lived on the island for quite some time, building a large hacienda with which he hoped to entice a local beauty, Martiniana (Prisca) Gómez Pantoja, into marriage. She married someone else, to his regret. A bit of the hacienda remains, and once served as a zoo.

A small Maya temple was once on the island's southern tip, but in 1988 Hurricane Gilbert extensively damaged it, leaving most of its foundation but only a very small part of the structure.

Since the 1970s, along with nearby Cancún and its Hotel Zone, there has been substantial tourist development in Isla Mujeres. Like much of the tourism industry, Isla Mujeres was economically devastated by the COVID-19 pandemic, although case numbers remained relatively low on the island.

== Geography ==
Isla Mujeres is approximately 7 kilometres (4.3 mi) long and 650 metres (2,130 ft) wide. To the east is the Caribbean Sea with a strong surf and rocky coast, and to the west the skyline of Cancún can be seen across the water. The western coast of Isla Mujeres is part of Costa Occidental de Isla Mujeres National Park. The southeast tip of Isla Mujeres is the easternmost point in Mexico.

== Transportation ==
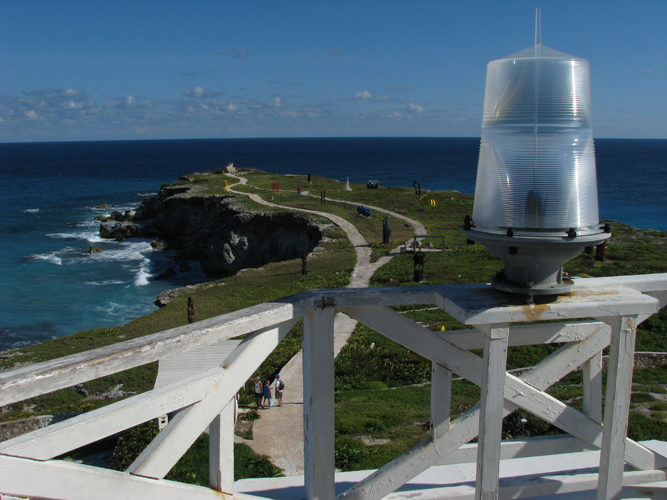
View from lighthouse on the southern tip

Transportation on Isla Mujeres consists primarily of taxis, golf carts, and moped scooters. As of 2005 there were 121 taxis, 500 golf carts, and 1500 moped scooters. A bus service also runs from the downtown to the different neighborhoods, called colonias in Spanish (where most locals live). The island was formerly served by Isla Mujeres National Airport, but the airport and landing strip have closed.

=== Ferry service to the mainland ===
Three main ferry and catamaran companies (UltraMar, Cancun Sailing, and Jetway) run to the island from Puerto Juárez, Cancún, and Gran Puerto. Many party boats also make day trips to Isla Mujeres. The island is popular with day trippers, but activity quiets down in the evening after the tour groups leave.

== Tourism ==
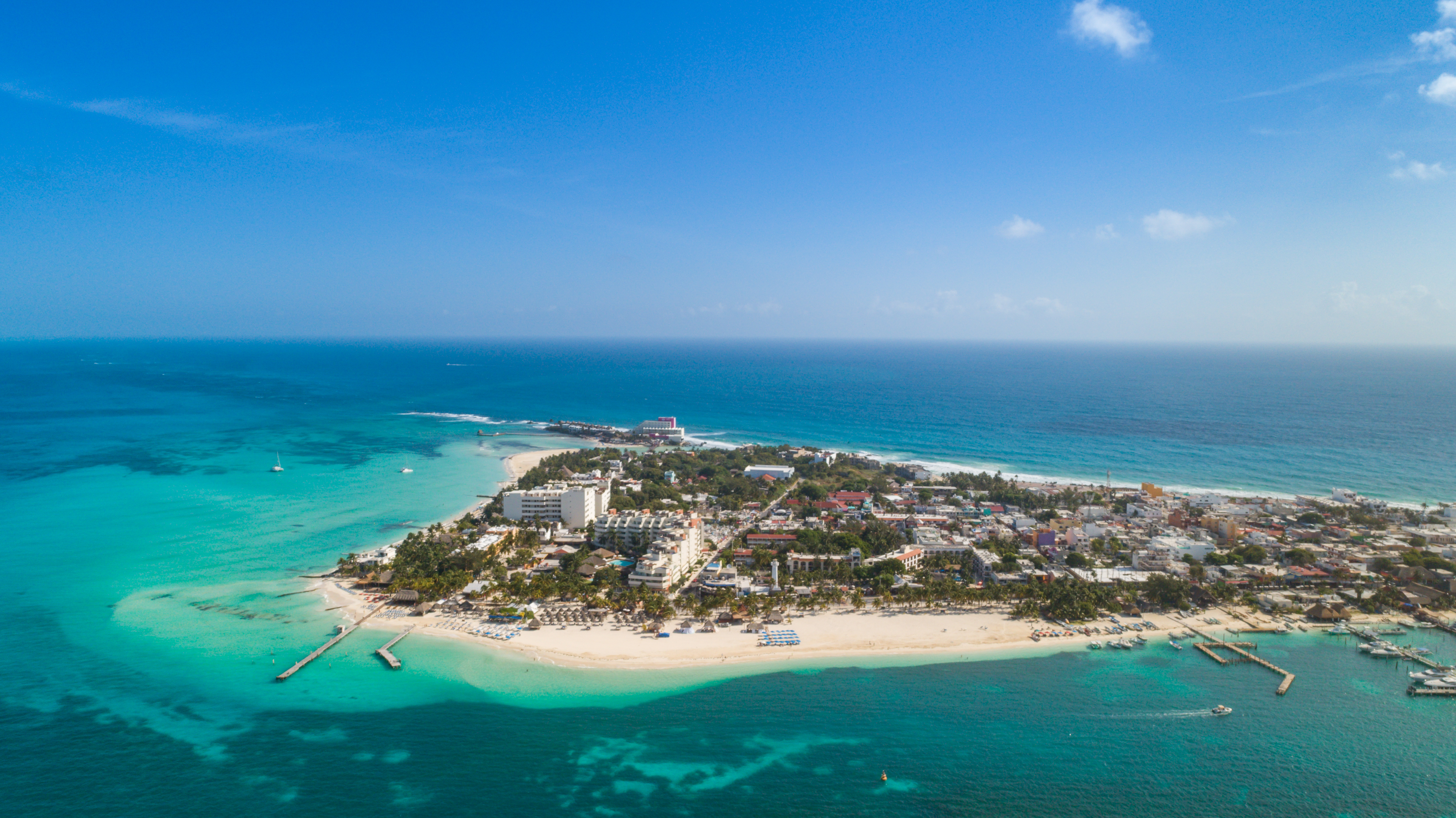
Aerial view of Isla Mujeres

Isla Mujeres has fostered a strong restaurant industry and culture, with many restaurants throughout the island. There are numerous places to eat fresh seafood cooked with local and traditional recipes, and other restaurants offer Mexican, Yucatecan, Italian, Caribbean, Mediterranean, Israeli, French, Thai, Cuban, and Maya cuisine, among others. In the north is El Centro (downtown), whose central axis, Hidalgo Street, is the main dining and entertainment area. Also on the north end is the famous beach Playa Norte, which recovered quickly after Hurricane Wilma hit the area in 2005. Besides these attractions, swimming with dolphins can also be experienced at the Island. Isla Mujeres has been a popular location for destination weddings for several decades, with the island's larger hotels sometimes used for wedding parties. Weddings are performed throughout the island, primarily at beachside venues on its west and north sides.

Isla Mujeres is close to many coral reefs, such as the one in Garrafon Park, an attraction popular for snorkeling and scuba diving. The Cancún Underwater Museum, created by English sculptor Jason deCaires Taylor, is off the island's western coast. Isla Mujeres is also home to a population of sea turtles. There used to be a facility named Tortugrana on the southern end of the island for the rehabilitation and breeding of sea turtles, but this closed in 2021.

The island's relative proximity to Cuba has made it a popular stepping stone for Cubans trying to reach the United States in recent years.

Isla Mujeres is considered one of the world's best places to catch sailfish.

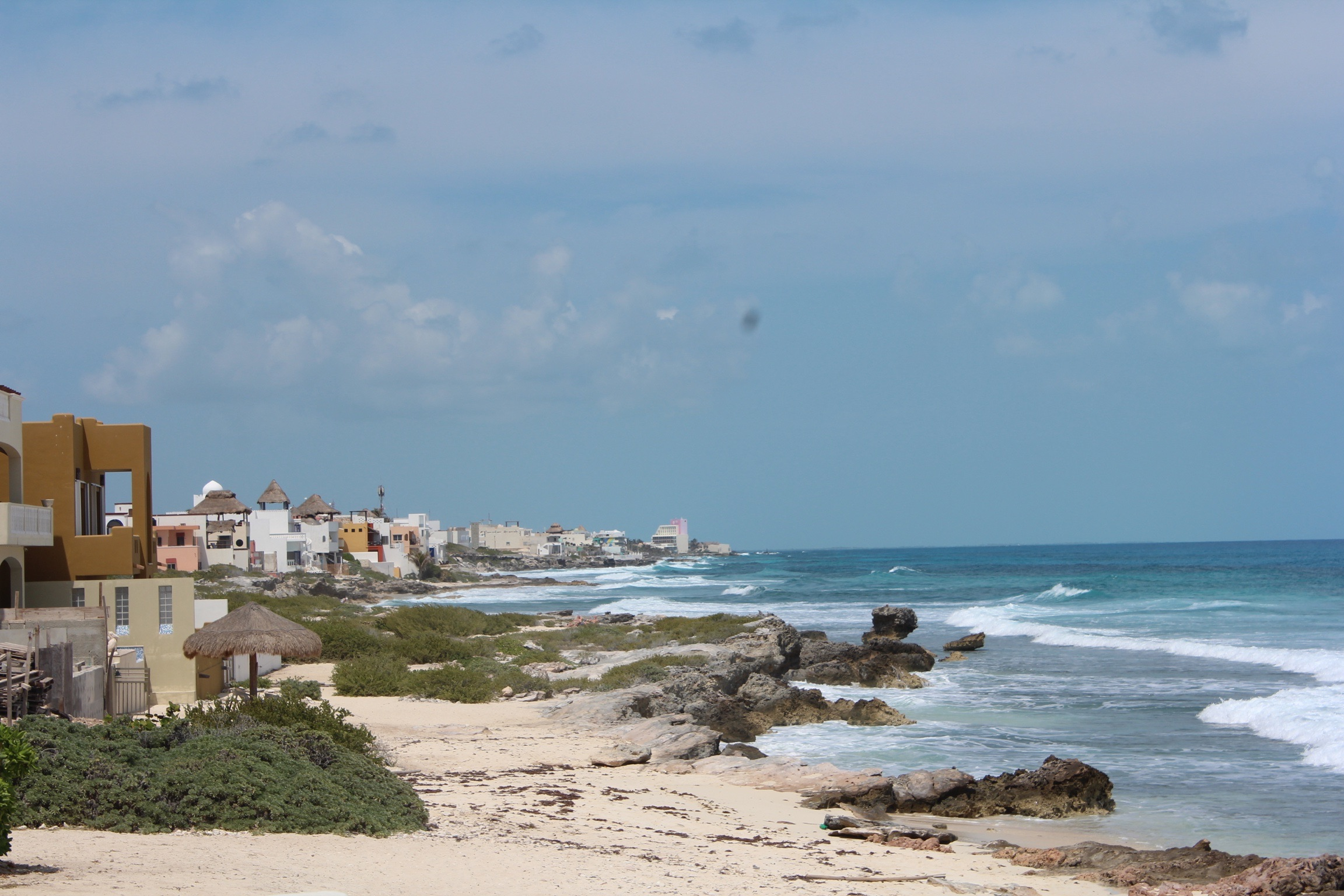
Beachside homes in Isla Mujeres

== Life on the island ==
Many homes have been built on the island, including those of people who have lived on the island for generations, affluent condos or houses for seasonal use, snowbirds, fishermen, and those working in the tourism and restaurant industry. The island also has a dedicated yacht and boating presence, with many docks on the west coast, including some designated for seasonal use. In general, the island's population declines in the winter due to the decline of tourism during that season. Some island residents ferry to and from Cancún daily for school or work.

Shopping on the island for residents was limited for many decades, making day trips to Cancún (sometimes on a specialized ferry for automobiles and shipping trucks) necessary to purchase items such as a television or foods not stocked at one of the many minisupers (locally run convenience stores) or the downtown supermercado (supermarket) in the city square. As the tourism industry increased in the late 2000s, businesses such as Chedraui began to establish a presence, reducing residents' need to go to Cancún.

The island has many stadiums, including a full-scale baseball park and organized football venue, along with makeshift dirt or sand fields on which local children and organized teams play. Technology on the island (particularly in the colonias) was humble for many years, as it was slow to adopt innovations in entertainment beyond the standard television. By the early '00s, technologies such as cable television, the arcade cabinet (most commonly an original or repurposed Neo Geo) and cellular phones began to become commonplace in local households.

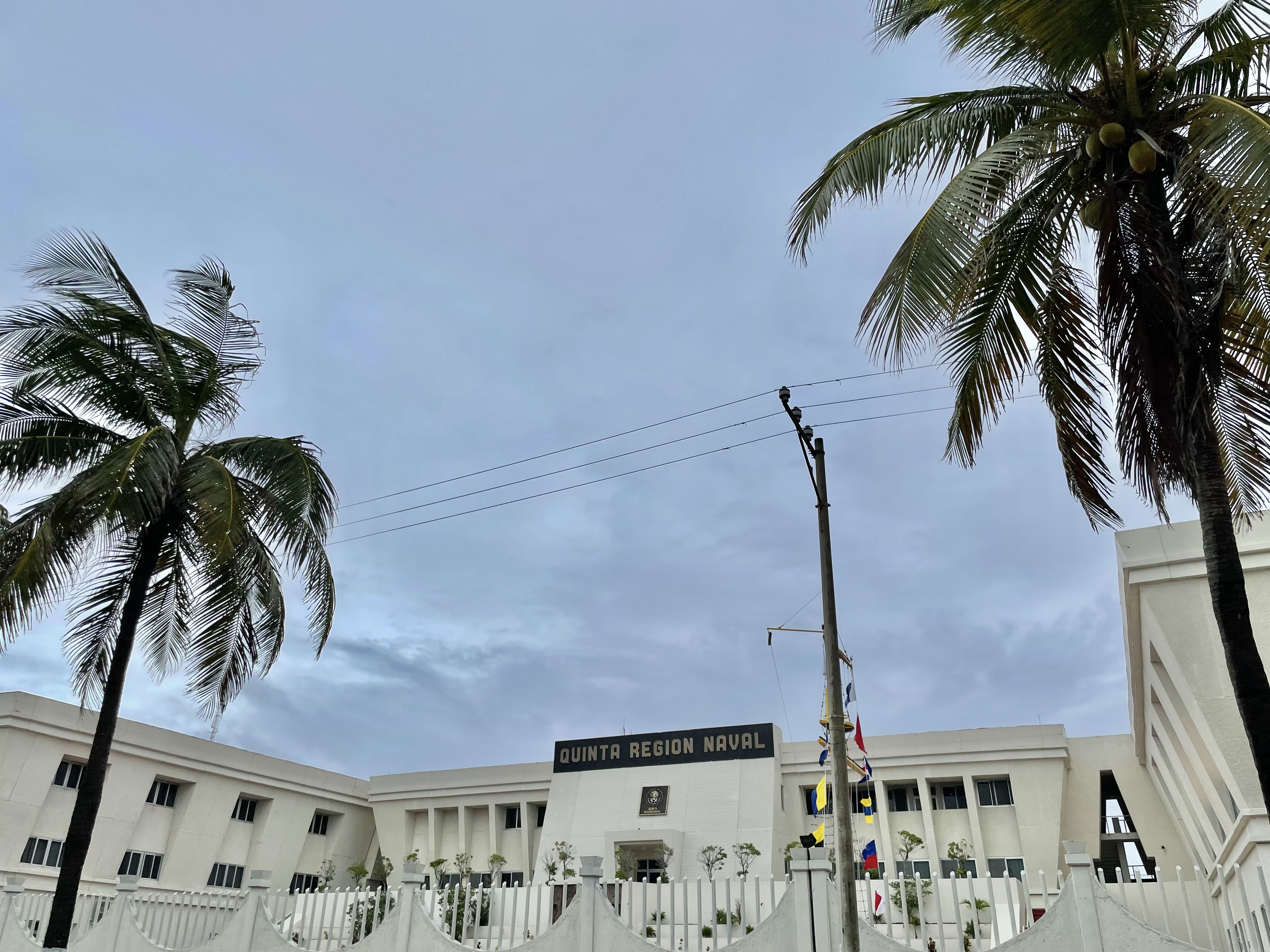
Quinta Region Naval (Base), Isla Mujeres, Quintana Roo, Mexico, 2022

Isla Mujeres is the home of Mexican naval base Quinta Región Naval.

Very little violent crime has been reported on the island over its history. The island has a reputation for its relaxed nature, as the safety of both residents and tourists is unusually high. The biggest danger to residents has historically been the threat of tropical storms and hurricanes, some of which, such as Hurricane Carmen and Hurricane Wilma, have caused devastating damage.
