= Ataliva =

- Commune
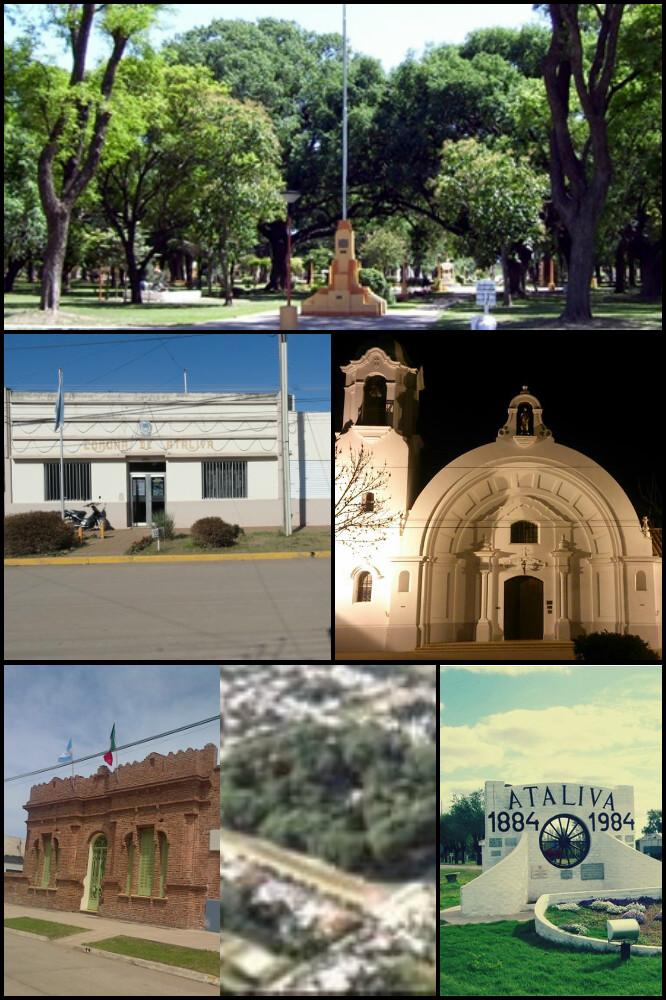
- Clockwise, from top: Plaza 25 de Mayo, Commune of Ataliva, San Roque Church, the Italian Society, an aerial view of Ataliva, Centennial Monument

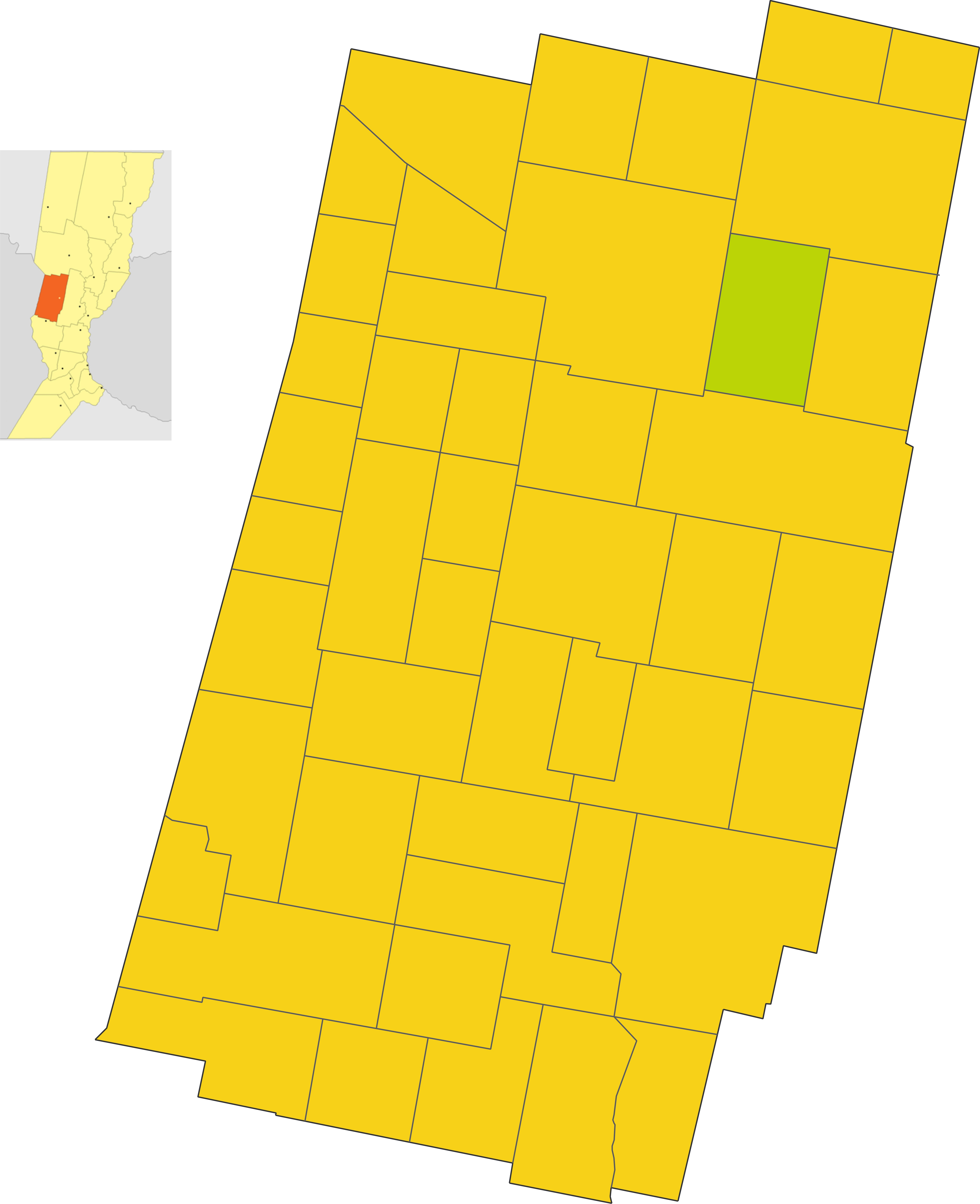
- The commune of Ataliva in the Castellanos Department
- Coordinates: 30°59′00″S 61°27′00″W
- Country: Argentina
- Province: Santa Fe
- Department: Castellanos
- Established: 21 February 1884

Government
  - Presidente comunal: Fabio César Sánchez

Area
  - Total: 155 km^{2} (60 sq mi)
- Elevation: 89 m (292 ft)

Population (2010)
  - Total: 2,065
  - Density: 13.32/km^{2} (34.5/sq mi)
- Time zone: UTC−3 (ART)
- Postal code: S2307
- Area code: 03493

Ataliva is a town in the department of Castellanos in the province of Santa Fe, Argentina. Founded at the end of the 19th century, it maintains some of the characteristics of the rest of the colonies: it is from the beginning a purely agricultural colony, with a population coming from a mostly Italian immigration process. It is the tenth most populated town in the Castellanos department; and the 106th in the province of Santa Fe. In 2010 it had a population of approximately 2100 inhabitants.

Ataliva was founded by the San Miguel de Tucumán native Ataliva Roca in 1884 in the area of the old railroad station. Since it was not in a good location due to the constant presence of quarrelsome gauchos, it was moved one kilometre to its present site.

Its urban physiognomy is characterized by an architecture of low houses, where wide streets, avenues and sidewalks with a leafy vegetation of trees of different species stand out.

As for its economy, agricultural and livestock activities stand out, since most of the rural population is dedicated to them.

The town of Ataliva is also known as the "chorizo capital", due to the production of handmade chorizo sausages.

== Geography ==
=== Location ===
It is located in South America, at 31° south latitude and 61° west longitude in the center west of the province of Santa Fe. Located on provincial routes 13 and 62 S, and 5 km from National Route 34, Ataliva is 107 km from the city of Santa Fe, 263 km from the city of Rosario, 316 km from Córdoba and 557 km from Buenos Aires.

=== Hydrography ===
It is located within the Cululú stream basin, which is the main collector of several tributaries and flows into the Salado River, northwest of the city of Esperanza.

The Sunchales stream originates in the city of the same name and crosses a large part of agricultural land, receiving contributions from streams and ditches. The stream crosses the northern sector (already a rural area) of the city from west to northeast and 5 km north of the city center.

=== Climate ===
Ataliva

Climate chart (precipitation, max. and min. temperature)
J	F	M	A	M	J	J	A	S	O	N	D
120 32 18	96 31 17	147 28 16	84 24 11	50 21 9	26 17 7	25 18 5	32 20 6	54 22 8	81 25 12	100 28 14	116 30 16
- █ Average max. and min. temperatures in °C
- █ Precipitation totals in mm
Imperial conversion
J	F	M	A	M	J	J	A	S	O	N	D
4.7 90 64	3.8 88 63	5.8 82 61	3.3 75 52	2 70 48	1 63 45	1 64 41	1.3 68 43	2.1 72 46	3.2 77 54	3.9 82 57	4.6 86 61
- █ Average max. and min. temperatures in °F
- █ Precipitation totals in inches

Ataliva has a humid subtropical climate (Cwa), also known as Pampean climate. Summers are hot and humid and winters are cool. Winds from the east and west are rare, of short duration and low intensity. In spring they blow with increasing force mainly from the north and northeast as a centre of cyclonic depression is defined in the polar front. Thunderstorms with wind and hail frequently occur in the summer.

There is rainfall year-round. The average annual temperature is 18.6 °C. Precipitation is 931 mm per year. The driest month is July, with 25 mm. The month with the most rainfall is March, with 147 mm. The hottest month of the year is January, with an average of 25.2 °C. The coldest month of the year is 12.1 °C in the middle of July. The difference in precipitation between the driest month and the rainiest month is 122 mm. The average temperatures vary during the year by 13.1 °C. Droughts and floods affect the city.

The flooding period usually occurs in late summer during the months of February and March, when it can rain more than 300 mm in a month. Floods do not occur every year, and their effects can be mitigated by the construction of drains and canals. Droughts, such as the one that has affected a large part of the Pampa plains since 2007, affect the city economically, since the decrease in agricultural production has an impact on the agribusiness of the city.

Other notable meteorological phenomena, although infrequent, are tornadoes and hurricane-force winds. On the other hand, fog during the winter is characteristic and hail is a normal phenomenon that, given its low intensity and strength, rarely presents significant problems.

There are no records of snowfall in the locality, although sleet fell on 1 August 2011.

Climate data for Ataliva
Month	Jan	Feb	Mar	Apr	May	Jun	Jul	Aug	Sep	Oct	Nov	Dec	Year
Record high °C (°F)	39.5 (103.1)	38.4 (101.1)	37 (99)	33.5 (92.3)	32.8 (91.0)	29.5 (85.1)	31.5 (88.7)	33.2 (91.8)	36.8 (98.2)	36.2 (97.2)	36.8 (98.2)	38.9 (102.0)	39.5 (103.1)
Mean daily maximum °C (°F)	32.1 (89.8)	31.4 (88.5)	28.9 (84.0)	24.2 (75.6)	21.5 (70.7)	17.8 (64.0)	18.4 (65.1)	20.4 (68.7)	22.4 (72.3)	25 (77)	28.8 (83.8)	30.8 (87.4)	25.2 (77.4)
Daily mean °C (°F)	25.5 (77.9)	24.5 (76.1)	22.4 (72.3)	17.8 (64.0)	15.3 (59.5)	12.5 (54.5)	12.1 (53.8)	13.5 (56.3)	15.4 (59.7)	18.6 (65.5)	21.8 (71.2)	23.8 (74.8)	18.6 (65.5)
Mean daily minimum °C (°F)	18.4 (65.1)	17.7 (63.9)	16 (61)	11.4 (52.5)	9.2 (48.6)	7.2 (45.0)	5.8 (42.4)	6.7 (44.1)	8.5 (47.3)	12.2 (54.0)	14.8 (58.6)	16.8 (62.2)	13.1 (55.6)
Record low °C (°F)	11.2 (52.2)	9.2 (48.6)	6.6 (43.9)	3.5 (38.3)	−1 (30)	−2 (28)	−2.5 (27.5)	−1.1 (30.0)	0.3 (32.5)	2.6 (36.7)	4.7 (40.5)	7.5 (45.5)	−2.5 (27.5)
Average precipitation mm (inches)	120 (4.7)	96 (3.8)	147 (5.8)	84 (3.3)	50 (2.0)	26 (1.0)	25 (1.0)	32 (1.3)	54 (2.1)	81 (3.2)	100 (3.9)	116 (4.6)	931 (36.7)
Average precipitation days (≥ 0.1 mm)	4	3	4	3	1	1	1	1	2	3	3	5	31
Average relative humidity (%)	70	74	79	80	81	81	80	77	74	74	73	71	76
Mean monthly sunshine hours	288.3	240.1	229.4	210.0	186.0	159.0	173.6	204.6	216.0	244.9	276.0	291.4	2,719.3

== History ==
=== 18th century ===
The territory where the city is located today, as well as all the west of Santa Fe, was inhabited by nomadic tribes. The only history of European population in the region was the foundation of the city of Sunchales in 1747 by the Spaniards. This city surpassed 1000 inhabitants at the end of the 18th century, but soon it entered in decadence by the continuous harassment of the native tribes of the place.

== Demographics ==
Historical population
Year	Pop.	±%
1884	56	—
1887	564	+907.1%
1895	1,958	+247.2%
1914	1,803	−7.9%
1933	1,703	−5.5%
1960	1,689	−0.8%
1980	1,711	+1.3%
1991	1,791	+4.7%
2001	1,968	+9.9%
2010	2,065	+4.9%

Ataliva has 2,065 inhabitants (Indec, 2010), of which 1,068 are male and 997 are female according to the 2010 National Census of Population, Homes and Dwellings, which represents an increase of 4.95% compared to the 1,968 inhabitants of the previous census.

Most of the inhabitants of Ataliva are Creoles and descendants of Italians and Spaniards, for this reason at the moment the immense majority of the population of the locality is composed by Argentineans, descending from Italy and Spain. Other nationalities and ethnicities exist also, such as Swiss and Germans. In addition, for years Ataliva has been receiving an important flow of internal migration, mainly from the interior of Santa Fe, as well as migrations from the provinces of Córdoba, Buenos Aires and Entre Ríos.

The city receives a constant flow of students from neighboring cities, mainly due to the IDESA secondary school (since it is one of the few agrotechnical schools in the area), which gradually increases the total population. Ataliva is constantly growing, expanding especially to the south, east and northeast.

According to the 2010 census, two immigrants live in Ataliva.

== Government ==
The Executive Power in Ataliva is exercised by the communal president, elected by popular vote every four years. The government building is located at 34 Lavalle Street, in the center of the city. The current communal president is Fabio César Sánchez, who won the communal elections from 2007 until 2017. Marcelo Bergese is the vice president.

== Sport ==
The most developed sport in terms of infrastructure and public, as in most of the country, is football. The Club Deportivo Independiente de Ataliva was founded on December 3, 1922. It currently plays in Group B of the Liga Rafaelina de Fútbol.

== Twin towns ==
- Pancalieri in Piedmont, Italy

== Notable people ==
- Danilo Tosello – footballer
