= Lombriasco =

- Comune
- Comune di Lombriasco

- Location within Italy Location within Piedmont
- Coordinates: 44°51′N 7°38′E
- Country: Italy
- Region: Piedmont
- Metropolitan city: Turin (TO)

Government
  - Mayor: Antonio Sibona (Lista Civica)

Area
  - Total: 7.21 km^{2} (2.78 sq mi)
- Elevation: 241 m (791 ft)

Population (31 January 2020)
  - Total: 1,055
  - Density: 146/km^{2} (379/sq mi)
- Demonym: Lombriaschesi
- Time zone: UTC+1 (CET)
  - Summer (DST): UTC+2 (CEST)
- Postal code: 10040
- Dialing code: 011
- Patron saint: Ognissanti (All the Saints)
- Saint day: 1 November
- Website: Official website

Lombriasco is a comune (municipality) in the Metropolitan City of Turin in the Italian region Piedmont, located about 25 kilometres (16 mi) south of Turin.
