= Provincial Route 70 (Santa Fe) =

Highway in Argentina

Provincial Route 70
- Ruta provincial 70

Route information
- Length: 122 km (76 mi)

Major junctions
- From: Recreo, Santa Fe
- To: Coronel Fraga, Santa Fe

Location
- Country: Argentina

Highway system
- Highways in Argentina

Provincial Route 70 (Spanish: Ruta Provincial 70) is a provincial road located in the central Santa Fe Province, which crosses it almost entirely from east to west. It begins on RN 11 in the city of Recreo and ends on the border with the Province of Córdoba in the vicinity of the town of Coronel Fraga.

Previously, it was called National Route 166. Through National Decree 1595 of 1979, this route passed to the jurisdiction of the province of Santa Fe.
