= Othon =

Othon or Othón may refer to:

- Othon Mataragas (born 1979), Greek composer, songwriter and pianist
- Charles Othon Frédéric Jean-Baptiste de Clarac (1777–1847), French artist, scholar and archaeologist
- Le Tilleul-Othon, commune in the Eure department in Haute-Normandie in northern France
- Othón P. Blanco, Quintana Roo, one of the eight subdivisions of the Mexican state of Quintana Roo
- Othón P. Blanco Núñez de Cáceres (1868–1959), Mexican Marine and the founder of the city of Chetumal
- Othon Bastos (born 1933), Brazilian film actor
- Othon Friesz (1879–1949), native of Le Havre, French artist of the Fauvist movement
- Othon Henri del Caretto, Marquis of Savona (1629–1685), Imperial Army commander and political figure
- Quentin Othon (born 1988), French footballer
- Otto of Greece (1815–1867), also called Othon, King of Greece
- Othon (Brazilian footballer) (1944–2024), full name Othon Valentim Filho, Brazilian footballer
