= Obregón =

Obregón or Obregon may refer to:

== Places ==
- Obregon, California, US
- Ciudad Obregón, Sonora, Mexico
- Cañadas de Obregón, Jalisco, Mexico

== Other uses ==
- Obregon (surname)
- Obregon (pistol), a Mexican-designed semi-automatic pistol
- Obregón F.C., a Mexican football club
- Obregon Kaine, a fictional character in the CrossGen series Negation

== See also ==
- Álvaro Obregón (disambiguation)
