= Xul-Ha =

- Mexican / mayan
- Location in Mexico
- Coordinates: 18°33′36″N 88°27′50″W
- Country Mexico: Mexico
- State: Quintana Roo
- Municipality: Othón P. Blanco

Population (2010)
  - Total: 2,037
- Time zone: UTC -5

Xul-Ha (Yucatec Maya pronunciation: [ʃulˈxa]) is a village located in Othón P. Blanco Municipality, in the Mexican state of Quintana Roo.
