= Tres Garantías =

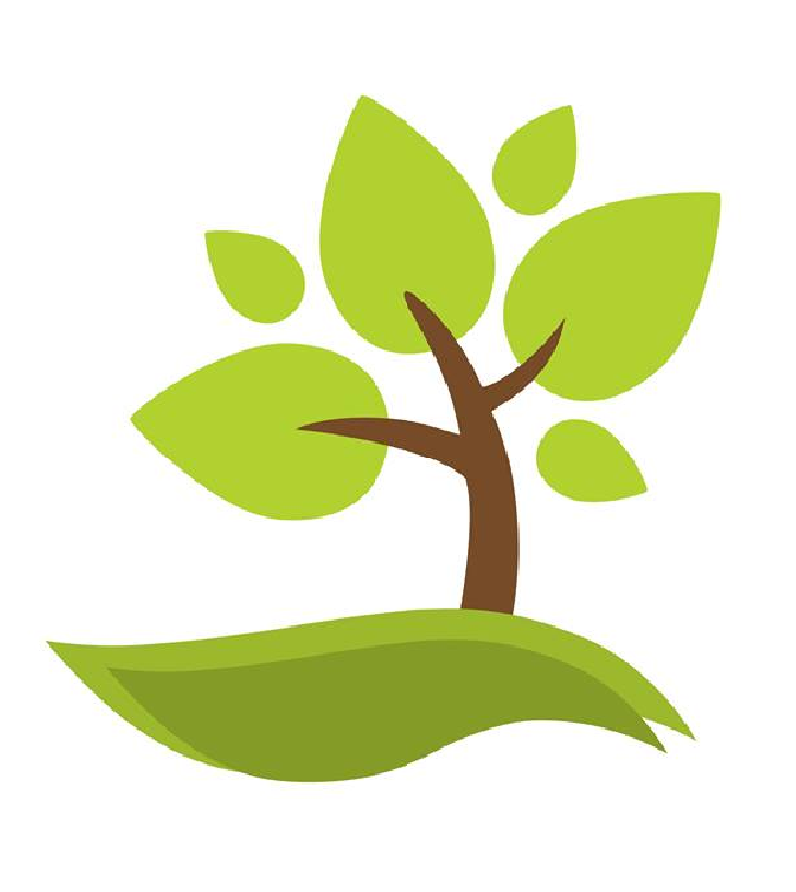
- Emblem

- Coordinates: 18°11′36″N 88°58′58″W
- Country: Mexico
- State: Quintana Roo
- Municipality: Othon P. Blanco
- Elevation: 158 m (518 ft)

Population (2010)
  - Total: 790
- Time zone: UTC−5 (EST)
- Postal code: 77991
- Area code: 983

Tres Garantías is a locality of state of Quintana Roo, which is Mexico. It has the status of ejido. It is a key location in the conservation of nature in Mexico. It has reached a sustainable forest management and has much potential in ecotourism, which has received a boost in recent years. It is also notable for having priceless cultural treasures yet to be examined and studied.

== History ==
From 1943, the inhabitants of Three Guarantees lived in the ejido The Union until the early 1970 settled in the current location. They are originally from the states of Veracruz, Yucatan, Campeche, Tabasco, Quintana Roo, Chiapas, Morelos, Guerrero, Michoacán and Oaxaca.

== Geography ==
Tres Garantías , is in the town of Othón P. Blanco, which is in the southern state of Quintana Roo. The town is located at coordinates 18°11′36″N 88°58′58″W. And San Jose de la Montana in the north, and Tomás Garrido in communities around Nicolas Bravo are located, Calderas, New Guadalajara (La Union) and The Corozalito in the south. It is possible to Tres Garantías by a 36 km paved road that connects with Federal Highway 186, which links the cities of Escárcega and Chetumal.

=== Hydrography ===
It belongs to the deep basin of the river, which is part of the Mexican eastern slope . The accumulated water on the surface form gaps or watery little extensive that abound during the rainy season. Near the community there are several gaps between the most well-known are Bacardi and Honda (the latter people consumed water), which are near road. Also in the basement there is water, but is far from the surface so it is not common to find wells. Currently the main source of drinking water is a well catchment.

=== Relief ===
The community is set on a flat relief to about 150 m. On the road you can see several structures with low or ak 'Alché, which are areas of flat land bounded by slightly more raised portions. These lower the gaps forming due to the impermeability of the floor.

=== Climate ===
It has classified as warm humid with summer rains, which is what is recorded in the continental entire state of Quintana Roo weather.

== Biodiversity ==
The type of biome having Three Guarantees is tropical forest, which is dominant in the state of Quintana Roo. It is one of the points more biodiversity the planet. It is rich in mammals and plants, especially birds and reptiles.

== Demographics ==
It has 790 inhabitants, according to census 2010. There are 416 men and 374 women. The female / male ratio is 0.899. The average number of live births per mother is 3.46. 266 people are economically active.

Tres Garantías in 71 people speak some indigenous language.

=== Religion ===
According to the census of INEGI in 2010, the religion with more adherents in the place is the Catholic 386 faithful. Denominations are also widespread Protestant, of which there are 249 adherents. 4 people have religions other than those already mentioned.

150 people are considered irreligious.

=== Traditions ===
May 15, is celebrated as the feast day of San Isidro, sometimes with a rodeo. It is also common holding Independence Day with a parade of students. The Christmas is important because many people gather on that date with their families elsewhere.

=== Education ===
The illiteracy rate among adults is 14.63% (12.16% for men and 17.12% women) and the level of education is 5.09 (5.17 in men and 5 women).

== Infrastructure ==
=== Housing ===
In the village there are 216 private dwellings. Total private homes with electricity is 198. The number of private homes that have water service is 197. 5 shall have at least one computer. Only one house has Internet service.

=== Public infrastructure ===
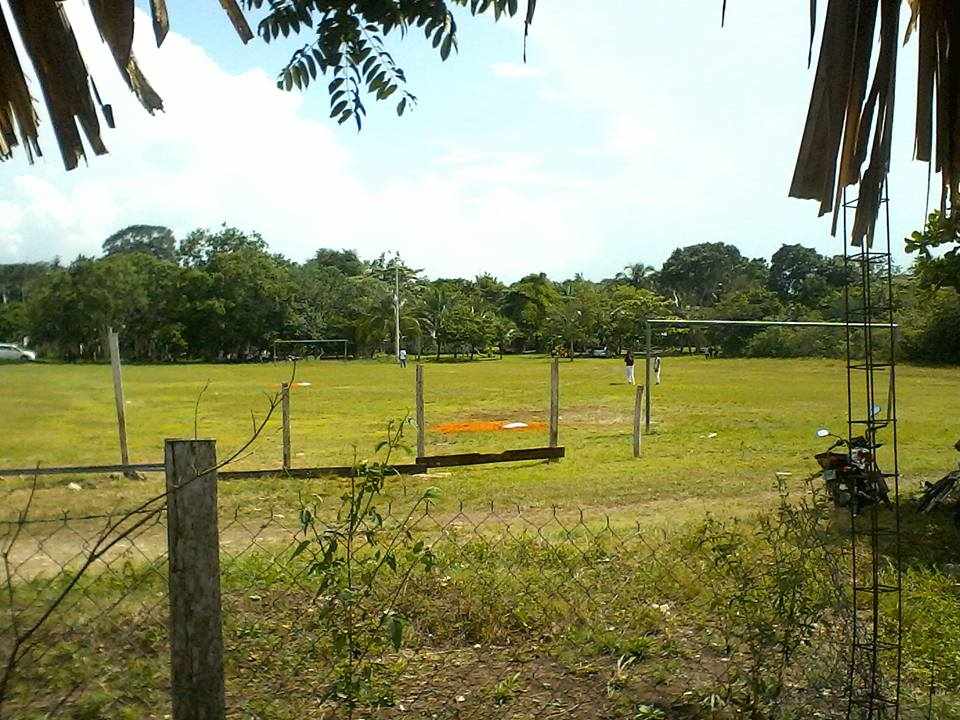
Sports field during a meeting of beibol

Tres Garantías currently has a kindergarten a primary a secondary and preparatory. It also has a sawmill, a clinic and a sports field.

== Sports ==
Baseball has many fans. There are two amateur sports teams, one of football or other baseball. Home games of both teams take on the sports field of the place, adapting depending on the sport field. Usually they play against teams from local villages.
