= Calderitas, Quintana Roo =

Calderitas
- Village
- Seal

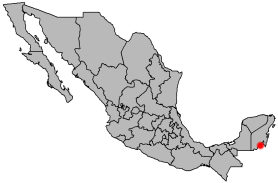
- Coordinates: 18°33′16″N 88°15′30″W
- Country: Mexico
- State: Quintana Roo
- Municipality: Othon P. Blanco
- Elevation: 9 m (30 ft)

Population (2010)
  - Village: 5,326
  - Urban: 5,326
- Time zone: UTC-5 (EST)

Calderitas is a city in the municipality of Othón P. Blanco, which is part of the Mexican state of Quintana Roo. It is situated on the east coast of the Yucatán Peninsula, in Chetumal Bay, just northeast of the city of Chetumal.

Because of its close proximity to the Caribbean coastline, it is vulnerable to hurricanes. Hurricane Janet and Hurricane Dean, both Category 5 storms, made landfall near Calderitas in 1955 and 2007 respectively.

There are beaches and a boat ramp, many restaurants, bars, beach resorts and other types of lodging in Calderitas, and the archaeological zone of Oxtankah is located 8 kilometers (5.0 mi) from the center of town.
