= Le Tilleul =

Le Tilleul may refer to the following communes in France:

- Le Tilleul, Seine-Maritime, in the Seine-Maritime département
- Le Tilleul-Lambert, in the Eure département
- Le Tilleul-Othon, in the Eure département
- Tilleul-Dame-Agnès, in the Eure département
