= Chakanbakán =

Ancient Maya city in Quintana Roo, Mexico

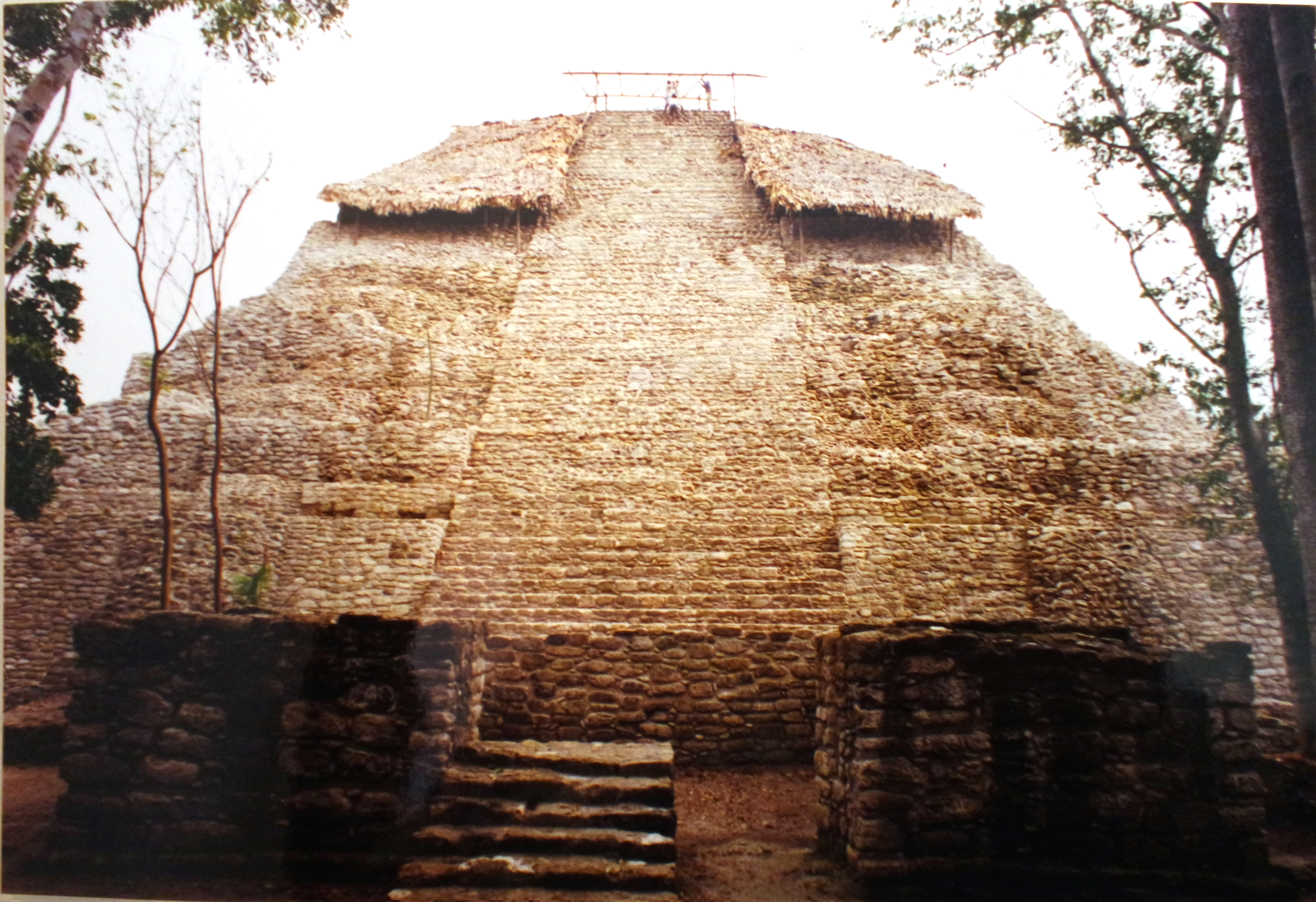
- Nohochbalam pyramid at Chakanbakán
- Interactive map of Chakanbakán
- Type: Ancient Maya city
- Periods: Preclassic - Late Classic
- Cultures: Maya civilization
- Location: Mexico
- Region: Quintana Roo

History
- Built: 700 BC - 900 AD
- Abandoned: 900 AD

Site notes
- Area: 30 km^{2} (12 sq mi)
- Public access: Restricted

Chakanbakán is an archaeological site and ancient Maya city located in the jungle of southern Quintana Roo in Mexico whose pre-Columbian occupation dates back to 700 BC. It reached its peak during the Late Preclassic period of the Maya civilization between 400 and 50 BC, developing as a major political center with great power in the region and prosperity due to its strategic geographical location surrounded by major bodies of water like the Om and Chakanbakán lagoons, it had extensive continuous development until its abandonment in the late Classic period after the collapse of the city.

The main structure of Chakanbakán is the Nohochbalam pyramid, a monumental stepped pyramid base of seven levels decorated on its facades with large pre-classic masks representing the face of deities with jaguar features. Most of the archaeological site is still buried beneath the thick jungle of the region, in the explored areas of the city, large structures have been discovered and identified, including ancient temples, a large acropolis, pyramids, ceremonial platforms, plazas, residential buildings, altars, ball courts, sculptures, and monuments with hieroglyphic inscriptions.

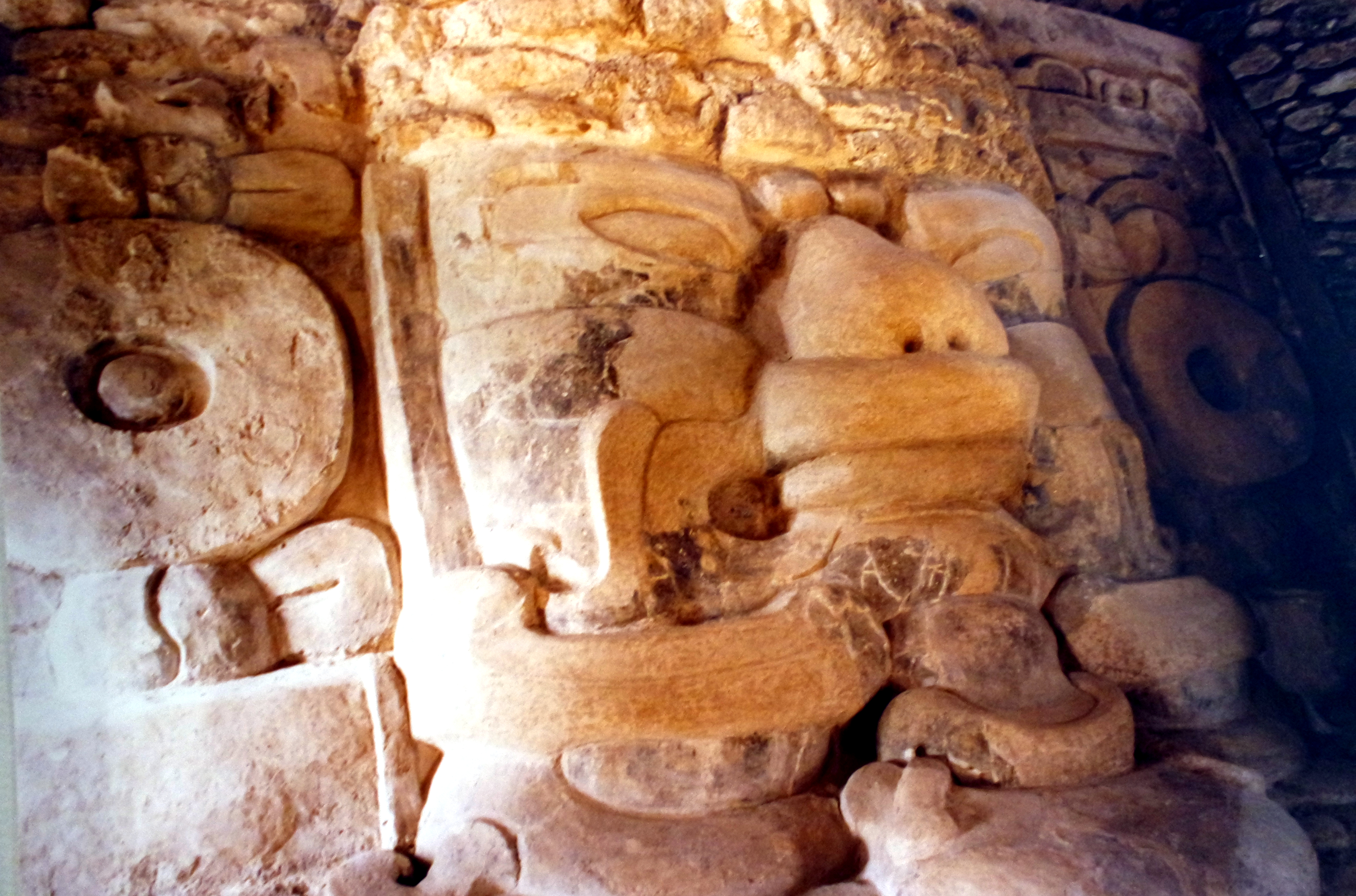
Large mask in the Nohochbalam pyramid

== Location ==
The archaeological site is located surrounding the Om lagoon and bordering the Chakanbakán lagoon in the municipality of Othón P. Blanco in southern Quintana Roo, Mexico, approximately 80 kilometers from the city of Chetumal. The small town of Caobas is the nearest inhabited place within the jungle. The Nohochbalam pyramid is visible from the road, rising above the jungle canopy.

== Archaeology ==
The city was built with a complex urban planning, taking advantage of the natural resources and access to large water sources that provided great prosperity to the settlement and also a strategic geographical position to defend itself against invasions or external attacks. The core and civic-ceremonial center of the city was built on an extensive platform 250 meters on each side, on which the main structures of the settlement are built. The Nohochbalam pyramid (which in Maya language means Great Jaguar) is the largest building in Chakanbakán and stands out for its large staircase flanked by a series of monumental masks between 3 and 4 meters high that date from the Preclassic period. These are considered some of the oldest of their kind and represent large faces of jaguar-associated deities with imposing stare, wearing headdresses, ear ornaments, and ceremonial helmets, their facial and sculptural features resemble those of Olmec art, which predates the Maya, demonstrating the influence of Olmec art in the region and the development of early artistic expressions by the Maya civilization.

In front of Nohochbalam is located the temple of Kulpool, an important open-air ceremonial structure inside which sculptures, an altar and ceramic remains have been found showing a great ceremonial activity related to human sacrifice dedicated to the deities that decorate the Nohochbalam pyramid. Inside the temple, four vessels containing skulls were found buried beneath its structure, which has been interpreted as a ritual in which the skulls correspond to the decapitated heads of players sacrificed at the end of the sacred ball game ceremony and offered to the jaguar god to whom the Nohochbalam pyramid was dedicated. The architectural complex called Ukuchilbaxal corresponds to the ball court of the city and is made up of 3 structures: two large platforms in the court where the game was played, with a big temple in front that served as the ceremonial building for the religious rituals linked to the sacred ball game.
