= Etymology of Oregon =

State name origin

The origin of the name of the U.S. state of Oregon is unknown, and a subject of some dispute.

== Historical usage ==
The earliest use of the name, spelled Ouragon, was by Major Robert Rogers in a 1765 petition to the Kingdom of Great Britain, seeking money to finance an expedition in search of the Northwest Passage. The petition read "the rout... is from the Great Lakes towards the Head of the Mississippi, and from thence to the River called by the Indians Ouragon...." Thus, the early Oregon Country and now the present-day state of Oregon took their names from the river now known as the Columbia River.

In 1766, Rogers commissioned Jonathan Carver to lead such an expedition and in 1778, Carver used Oregon to label the Great River of the West in his book Travels Through the Interior Parts of North America. The poet William Cullen Bryant took the name from Carver's book and used it in his poem Thanatopsis, published in 1817, to refer to the recent discoveries of the Lewis and Clark Expedition, which helped establish the name in modern use.

Other theories suggest that Rogers appropriated the Abenaki name for the Ohio River, Waregan, or found the name Ourican on a highly speculative 1715 French map.

== Possible origins ==
There are many theories about the reason why Rogers used the name, including these:

- George R. Stewart argued in a 1944 American Speech article that the name came from an engraver's error in a French map published in the early 18th century on which the Ouisiconsink (Wisconsin River) was spelled Ouaricon-sint, broken into two lines with the -sint below, so that there appeared to be a river flowing to the west named Ouaricon. The theory was endorsed in Oregon Geographic Names as "the most plausible explanation".
- In a 2004 article for the Oregon Historical Quarterly, Professor Thomas Love and Smithsonian linguist Ives Goddard argue that Rogers chose the word based on exposure to either of the Algonquian words wauregan and olighin, both meaning "good and beautiful (river)", but in Rogers' day referring to the Ohio River. According to their theory, Rogers was inspired by a reference to a Belle Rivière, or "Beautiful River" (which could have arguably stood for the river in question) in Antoine-Simon Le Page du Pratz's Histoire de la Louisiane, published in 1758. Le Page du Pratz also referred to an alleged Indian origin for this name but did not supply an Indian word for it. Goddard and Love then surmise that Rogers substituted his bastardization of the Mohegan pidgin word wauregan for Le Page du Pratz's "translation" Belle Rivière.
- John E. Rees in a 1920 article for the Oregon Historical Quarterly also ascribed the first use to Jonathan Carver, but hypothesized that the word derived from two Shoshone words, Ogwa (river) and Pe-On (west) which Carver had heard on his visits to Sioux Indians (where the Sioux pronounced gwa as an r). In other words, the word Oregon would mean something like "River of the West" in Shoshone. He does not trace the word back to Col. Rogers.
- T.C. Elliott described the theory that the name was a corruption of the French word ouragan (hurricane, windstorm, or tornado), which was applied to the River of the West based on Native American tales of powerful Chinook winds on the lower Columbia River, or perhaps from firsthand French experience with the Chinook winds of the Great Plains. At the time, the River of the West was thought to rise in western Minnesota and flow west through the Great Plains.
- One theory suggests that Oregon is a corruption of the French origan (oregano), a theory dismissed by Harvey W. Scott, a historian and early editor of The Oregonian. According to Scott, it was "a mere conjecture absolutely without support. More than this, it is completely disproved by all that is known of the name."

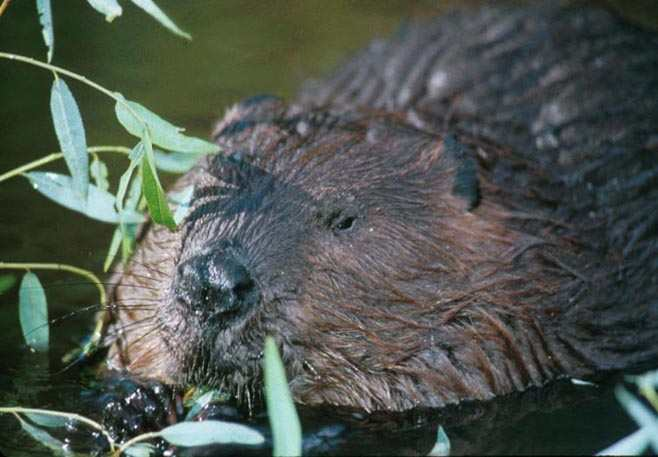
An abundance of beavers gave Oregon the nickname the Beaver State

- In 2001, archaeologist Scott Byram and David G. Lewis published an article in the Oregon Historical Quarterly arguing that the name Oregon came from a Western Cree pronunciation of the Chinook Jargon word oolighan (see eulachon), referring to grease made from fish, a highly prized food source for Native Americans of the region. Allegedly, the trade routes brought the term westward.
- In 1863, Archbishop François Norbert Blanchet advanced the theory that the name derives from early Spanish settlers who referred to the big, ornamented ears of the region's native people by the name Orejon.
- Joaquin Miller argued in Sunset magazine, in 1904, that "The name, Oregon, is rounded down phonetically, from Ouve água—Oragua, Or-a-gon, Oregon—given probably by the same Portuguese navigator that named the Farallones after his first officer, and it literally, in a large way, means cascades: 'Hear the waters.' You should steam up the Columbia and hear and feel the waters falling out of the clouds of Mount Hood to understand entirely the full meaning of the name Ouve a água, Oregon."

Others have speculated that the name is related to the kingdom of Aragon: the major part of the Spanish soldiers who conquered the West Coast from California to Vancouver Island in the 18th century were in fact from Catalonia, a principality of the ancient Crown of Aragon in Spain. The name might also be derived from the Spanish last name Obregón, which in turn is related to a Spanish place name Obregon in Santander, Spain, on the north coast.

== See also ==
- List of U.S. state name etymologies
- List of Oregon county name etymologies
