= Goupillières, Eure =

Goupillières
- Part of Goupil-Othon
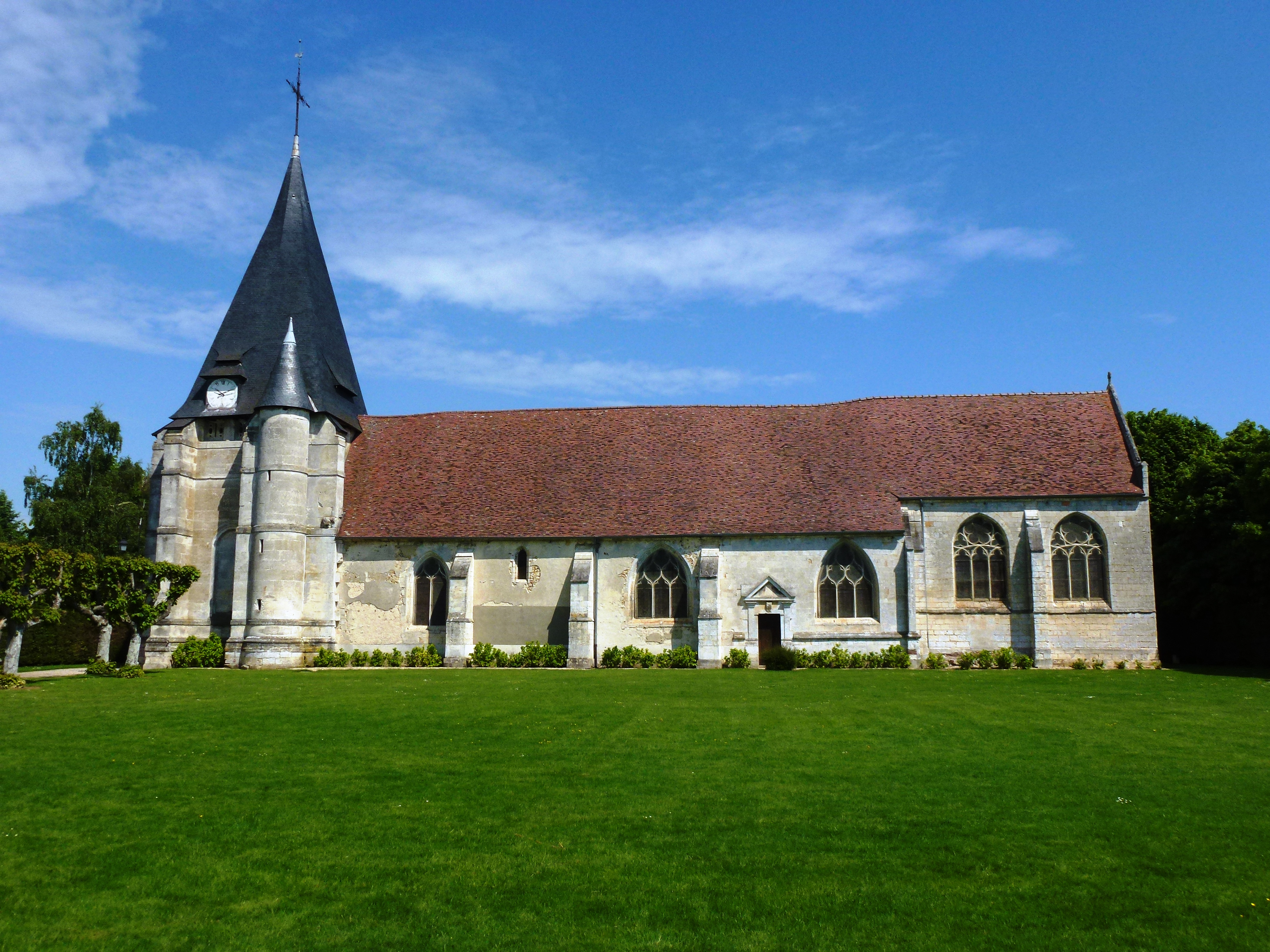

- Coat of arms
- Location of Goupillières
- Location within France Location within Normandy
- Coordinates: 49°07′38″N 0°45′31″E
- Country: France
- Region: Normandy
- Department: Eure
- Arrondissement: Bernay
- Canton: Brionne
- Commune: Goupil-Othon
- Area^{1}: 10.12 km^{2} (3.91 sq mi)
- Elevation: 149 m (489 ft)
- Highest elevation: 154 m (505 ft)
- Lowest elevation: 71 m (233 ft)
- Population (2018): 893
  - Density: 88.2/km^{2} (229/sq mi)
- Time zone: UTC+01:00 (CET)
  - Summer (DST): UTC+02:00 (CEST)
- Postal code: 27170
- ^{1} French Land Register data, which excludes lakes, ponds, glaciers > 1 km^{2} (0.386 sq mi or 247 acres) and river estuaries.

Goupillières (French pronunciation: [ɡupijɛʁ]) is a former commune in the Eure department in northern France. On 1 January 2018, it was merged into the new commune of Goupil-Othon.

== Population ==
Historical population
Year	Pop.	±% p.a.
1962	623	—
1968	624	+0.03%
1975	608	−0.37%
1982	656	+1.09%
1990	655	−0.02%
1999	654	−0.02%
2006	702	+1.02%
2018	893	+2.03%
Source: EHESS and INSEE

== See also ==
- Communes of the Eure department
