= Xcalak =

Village in Quintana Roo, Mexico

- Village
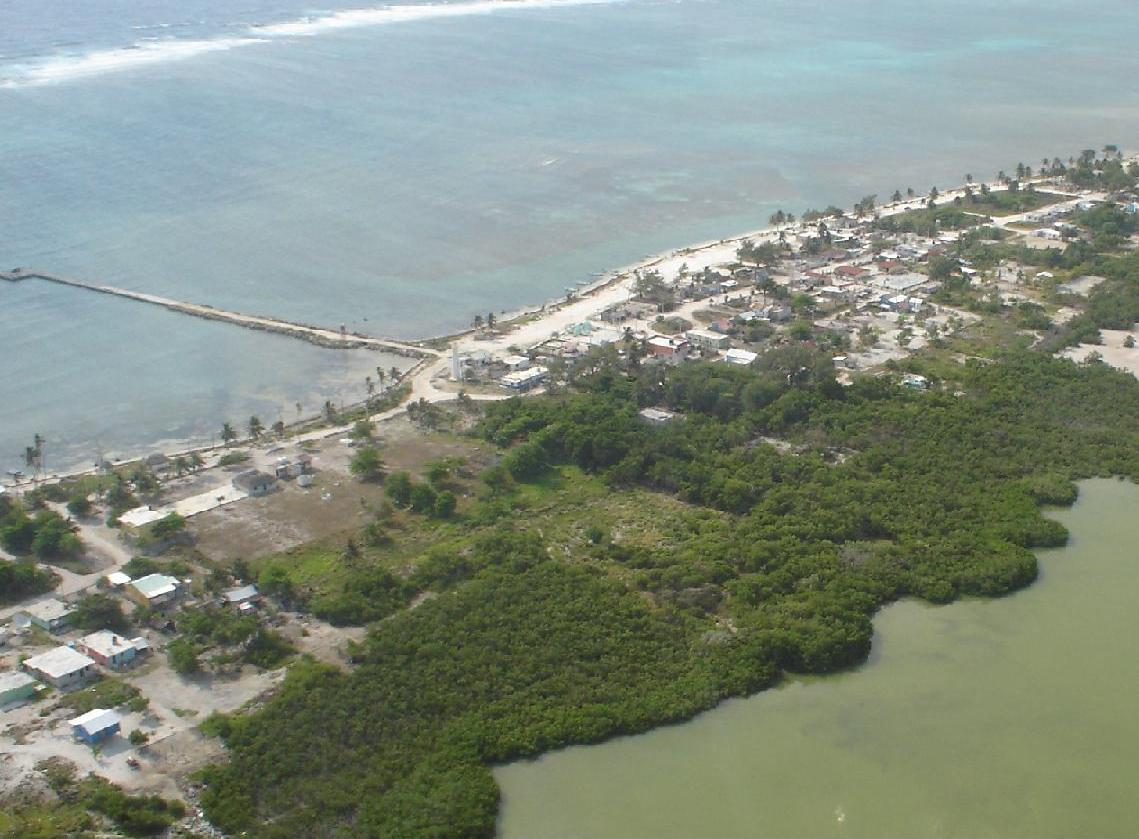
- View of Xcalak

- Location within Mexico
- Coordinates: 18°16′17″N 87°50′09″W
- Country: Mexico

Population
  - Total: 375

Xcalak (Spanish pronunciation: [ʃkaˈlak]) is a village of 375 inhabitants in the municipality of Othón P. Blanco, Quintana Roo, on the Caribbean coast of Mexico. It is one of the last "unspoiled" stretches of the Mexican Caribbean located on the southern end of the Costa Maya. The world's second-largest barrier reef passes just off-shore from Xcalak and it is also a departure point for dive trips to the Chinchorro Bank (Banco Chinchorro) atoll reef system. It is designated a Mexican national reef park (Parque Nacional Arrecifes de Xcalak) and is an excellent site for snorkeling, scuba diving and fly fishing. It is 60 kilometers (37 mi) south of Mahahual, the site of a new large cruise ship pier, and just north of the border with Belize. The Mahahual pier was destroyed by hurricane Dean in 2007. This section of the coast is now being developed by the tourism industry and has a growing number of Americans and other expatriates investing in beach front property north of town. However, development is nowhere close to the degree of development in Cancún and Playa del Carmen to the north.

== History ==
The first settlements in the region date from the Pre-Columbian era. Nearby are the ruins of the Mayan city of Xcalak, from which the town derives its name.

In May 1900, the Mexican Navy established the villa of Xcalak as a control post for the region. There the first shipyard of the Mexican Caribbean was constructed.

During the twentieth century, the area became a major population area, with a significant production of coconut from coco palm plantations that reached up to 300 tons monthly. In 1955, the city was whipped by Hurricane Janet, which destroyed a large part of the town and scattered the population to other areas.

== Climate ==
Xcalak was the largest city in Quintana Roo until it was destroyed by Hurricane Janet in 1955. Hurricane Dean struck Majahual, only 50 kilometers north of Xcalak in 2007.

Climate data for Xcalak
| Month | Jan | Feb | Mar | Apr | May | Jun | Jul | Aug | Sep | Oct | Nov | Dec | Year |
|---|---|---|---|---|---|---|---|---|---|---|---|---|---|
| Mean daily maximum °C (°F) | 28.0 (82.4) | 28.0 (82.4) | 29.5 (85.1) | 30.8 (87.4) | 31.7 (89.1) | 31.5 (88.7) | 31.7 (89.1) | 31.8 (89.2) | 31.5 (88.7) | 30.6 (87.1) | 29.1 (84.4) | 27.9 (82.2) | 30.2 (86.4) |
| Mean daily minimum °C (°F) | 21 (70) | 21.3 (70.3) | 22.6 (72.7) | 23.6 (74.5) | 24.5 (76.1) | 24.3 (75.7) | 24.6 (76.3) | 24.5 (76.1) | 24.4 (75.9) | 22.9 (73.2) | 21.9 (71.4) | 20.8 (69.4) | 23.0 (73.4) |
| Average precipitation mm (inches) | 81 (3.2) | 30 (1.2) | 13 (0.5) | 33 (1.3) | 58 (2.3) | 150 (6) | 74 (2.9) | 91 (3.6) | 190 (7.3) | 160 (6.2) | 140 (5.7) | 110 (4.3) | 1,130 (44.6) |
Source: Weatherbase
