= Álvaro Obregón, Quintana Roo =

Álvaro Obregón
- Location in Mexico
- Coordinates: 18°17′39″N 88°39′21″W
- Country: Mexico
- State: Quintana Roo
- Municipality: Othón P. Blanco

Population (2010)
  - Total: 2,869
- Time zone: UTC -5

Álvaro Obregón is a village located in Othón P. Blanco Municipality, in the Mexican state of Quintana Roo.

== History ==
The historical development of the ejido of Álvaro Obregón is closely tied to the federal policies implemented during the administration of President Luis Echeverría (1970–1976), a period that led to Quintana Roo’s transition from federal territory to statehood in 1974. One of the federal government’s central objectives during this time was to increase population and agricultural productivity in the southern region of the territory in order to meet the minimum population requirement of 80,000 inhabitants necessary for statehood.

Unlike northern Quintana Roo—where poor soil conditions limited agriculture and development focused instead on tourism—the southern zone, particularly the area influenced by the Hondo River, was identified as having fertile land suitable for intensive farming. According to research by Carlos Hugo Zamudio Viveros, a specialist in regional social studies, these environmental advantages shaped a development strategy centered on commercial agriculture and agroindustry rather than subsistence farming.

Within this context, Álvaro Obregón became part of a large-scale agricultural initiative launched in 1970 for the Ribera del Río Hondo region. This project designated more than 234,000 hectares as a sugarcane-producing zone extending from Subteniente López to La Unión. The ejido of Álvaro Obregón was incorporated into this plan through agrarian land redistribution policies that had originally begun under President Lázaro Cárdenas (1934–1940) and were later reinforced to encourage internal migration and settlement.

In 1971, the federal government carried out new geohydrological, soil, and rainfall studies across several ejidos along the Hondo River, including Álvaro Obregón. These studies analyzed a total of 25 hectares, of which 17 were found to have excellent conditions for sugarcane cultivation. The favorable results from land within Álvaro Obregón directly influenced the decision to establish regional sugar production infrastructure.

As a result, the construction of the “Álvaro Obregón” sugar mill was authorized to process sugarcane and produce sugar for the region. To facilitate this project, 29 hectares of land from the Álvaro Obregón ejido were expropriated in 1972, along with an additional 20 hectares from the neighboring ejido of Pucté. The sugar mill became a central element in transforming Álvaro Obregón’s economy, marking its transition from a primarily peasant-based agricultural system to one integrated into the agroindustrial sugarcane sector.
