= Álvaro Obregón (disambiguation) =

Álvaro Obregón (1880–1928) was the 46th president of Mexico.

Álvaro Obregón may also refer to:

- Álvaro Obregón Tapia (1916–1993), a Mexican politician, son of the president
- Álvaro Obregón, Mexico City, a borough
- Álvaro Obregón Municipality, in Michoacán
  - Álvaro Obregón, Michoacán, a town in the municipality
- Álvaro Obregón, Quintana Roo, a village in Othón P. Blanco Municipality
- Álvaro Obregón metro station, a future Mexico City Metro station
- Álvaro Obregón (Mexico City Metrobús), a BRT station in Mexico City
