= Mahahual =

Village in Quintana Roo, Mexico

Coordinates: 18°42′50″N 87°42′34″W

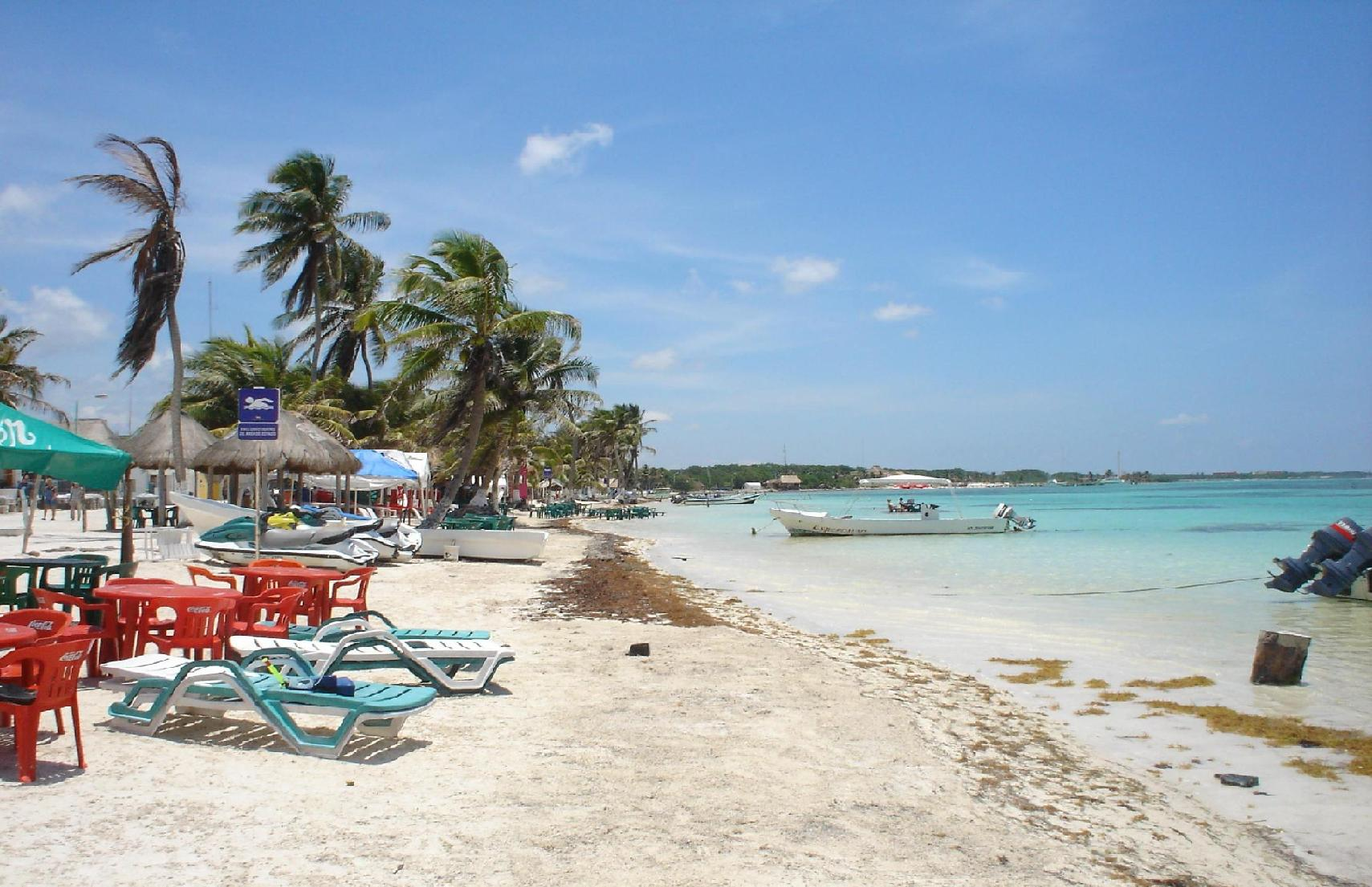
Mahahual beach

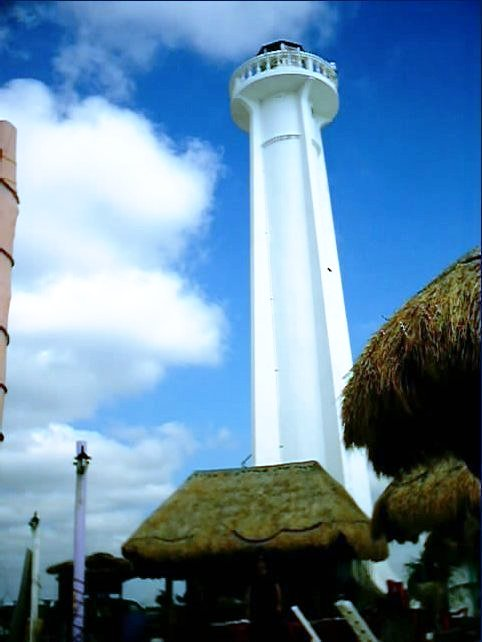
Mahahual lighthouse

Mahahual (Spanish pronunciation: [maxaˈwal]) is a village on the Costa Maya in the municipality of Othon P. Blanco on the Caribbean Sea coast of the state of Quintana Roo, Mexico. Previously a fishing village, it is now a rapidly developing tourist center.

The name of Mahahual possibly comes from the word "mahahua", a medium-sized tree native to tropical America.

The village of Mahahual is only about 3 kilometers (1.9 mi) away from the Costa Maya cruise port, and cruise ships can easily be seen from the village. Mahahual has soft sand beaches, grass-thatched palapas, and the Mesoamerican Barrier Reef that runs along the coast. Many hotels, bars, restaurants, and shops can be found in this quaint tourist town.

In 2010, Mahahual had a population of 920. Mahahual is to become a larger tourist center with an airport and a large dock for cruise ships.

A new development called New Mahahual is being created directly inland from the port. When ships are in port, the village is busy with cruise passengers.

Mayor Obed Durón Gomez was shot and killed by an unknown assailant while en route to Xcalak on 6 April 2020.
