= Goupil-Othon =

- Commune
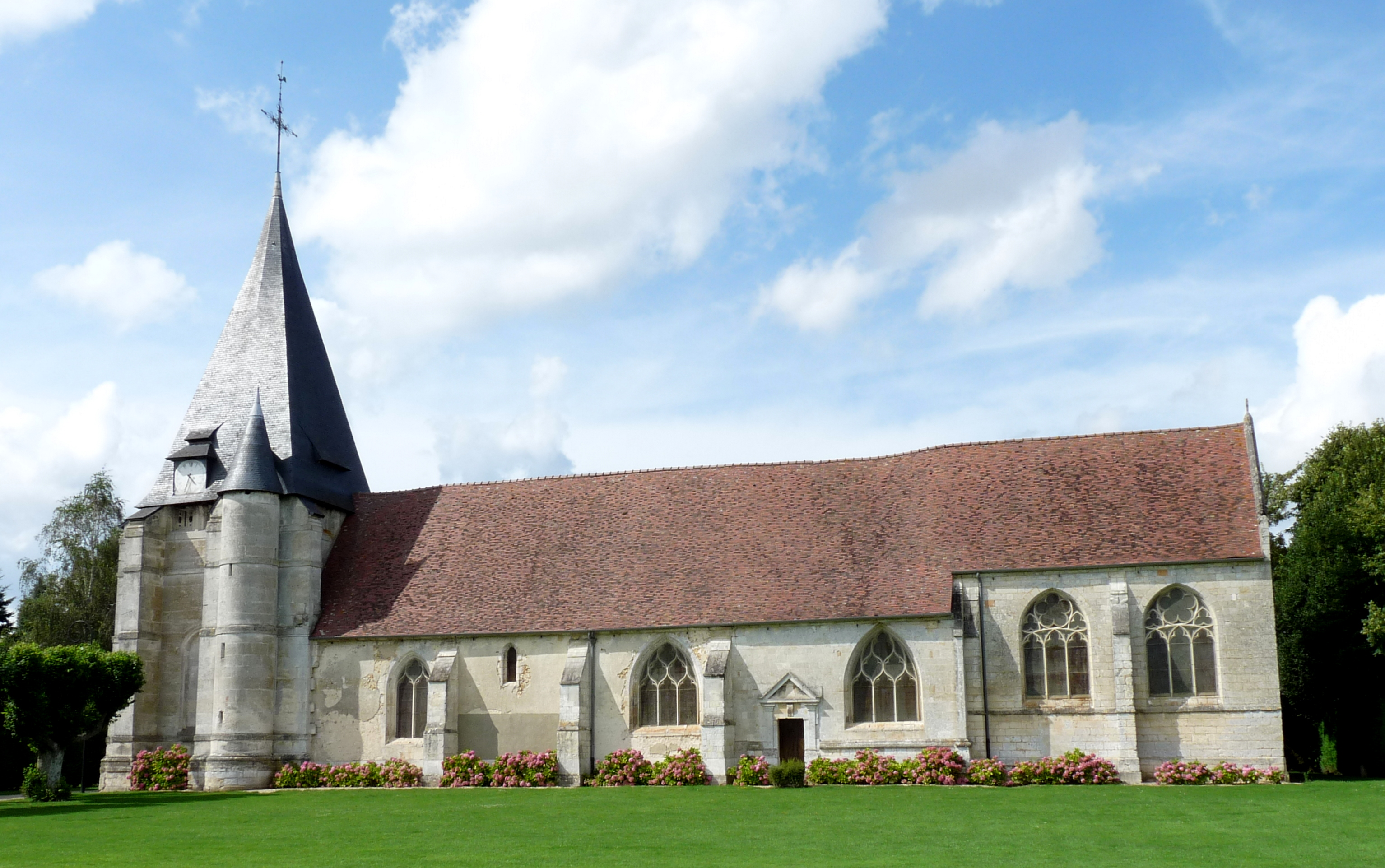
- The church of Notre-Dame in Goupillières
- Location of Goupil-Othon
- Location within France Location within Normandy
- Coordinates: 49°07′38″N 0°45′31″E
- Country: France
- Region: Normandy
- Department: Eure
- Arrondissement: Bernay
- Canton: Brionne
- Intercommunality: Bernay Terres de Normandie

Government
  - Mayor (2020–2026): Sébastien Roehm
- Area^{1}: 14.80 km^{2} (5.71 sq mi)
- Population (2023): 1,220
  - Density: 82.4/km^{2} (213/sq mi)
- Time zone: UTC+01:00 (CET)
  - Summer (DST): UTC+02:00 (CEST)
- INSEE/Postal code: 27290 /27170
- ^{1} French Land Register data, which excludes lakes, ponds, glaciers > 1 km^{2} (0.386 sq mi or 247 acres) and river estuaries.

Goupil-Othon (French pronunciation: [ɡupil ɔtɔ̃]) is a commune in the department of Eure, northern France. The municipality was established on 1 January 2018 by merger of the former communes of Goupillières (the seat) and Le Tilleul-Othon.

== Geography ==
The commune along with another 69 communes shares part of a 4,747 hectare, Natura 2000 conservation area, called Risle, Guiel, Charentonne.

== See also ==
- Communes of the Eure department
