= Bacalar Municipality =

Bacalar
- Municipality
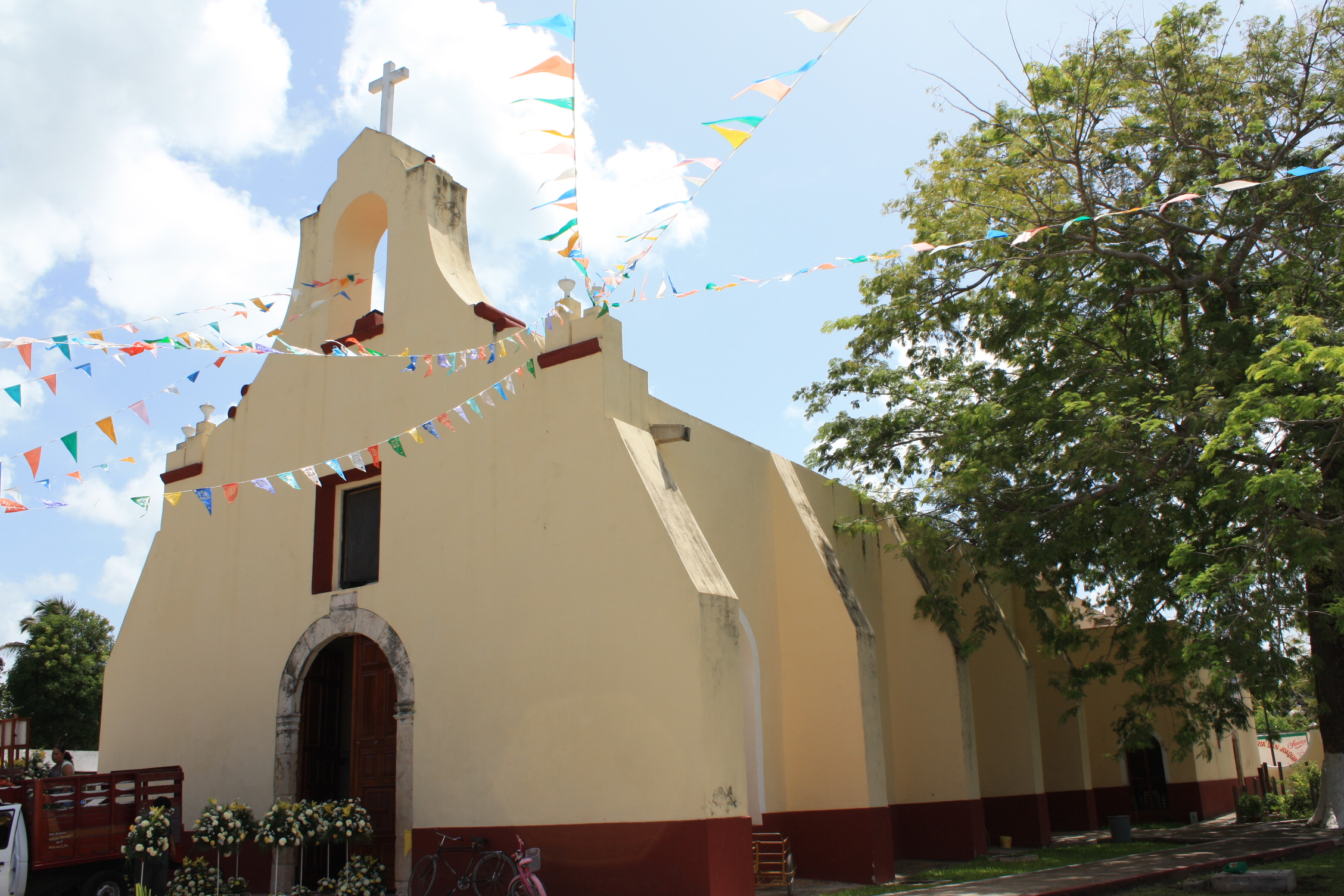
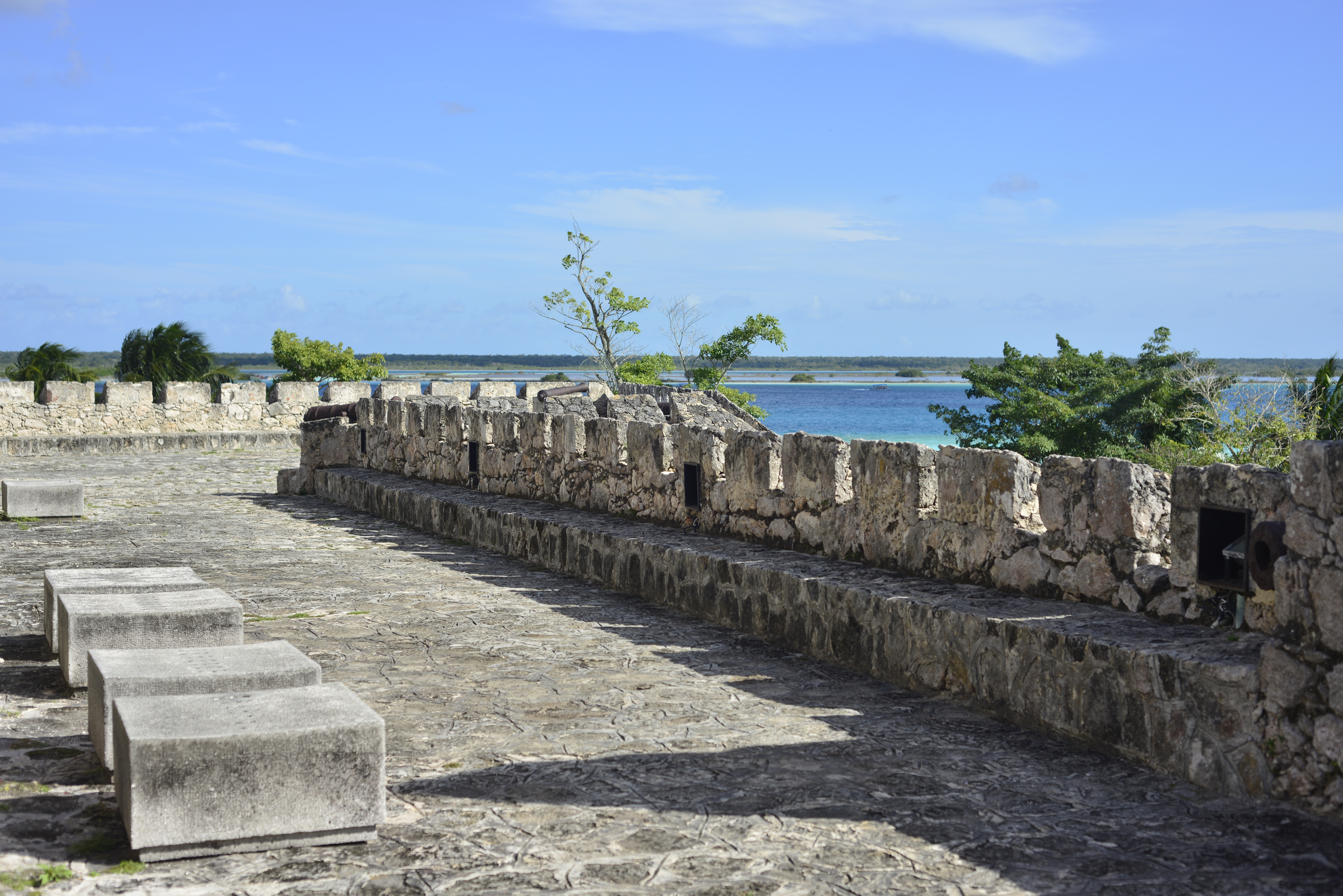
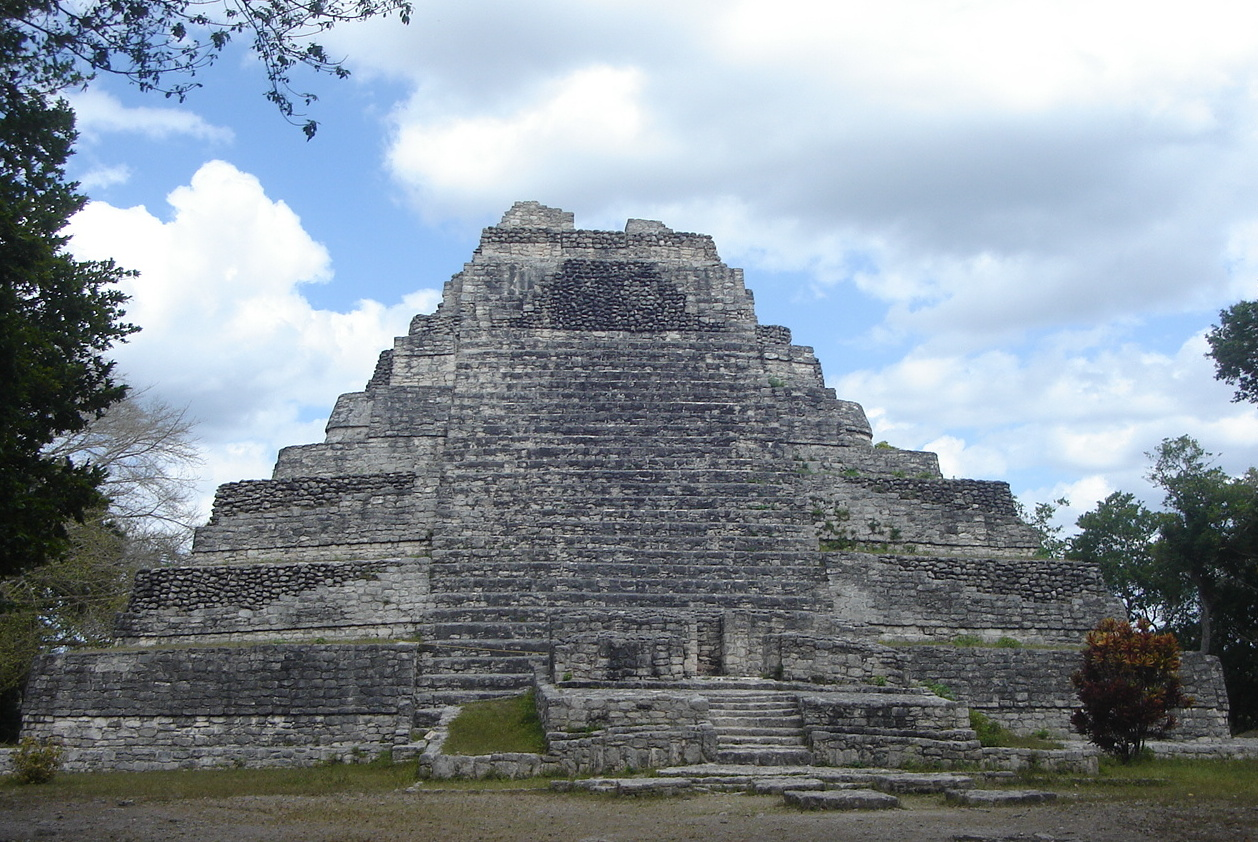
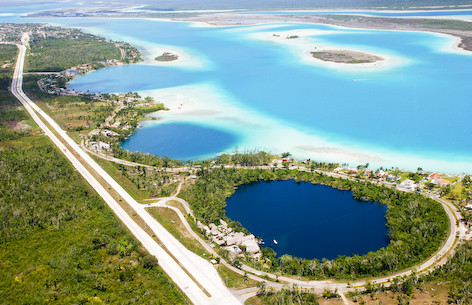
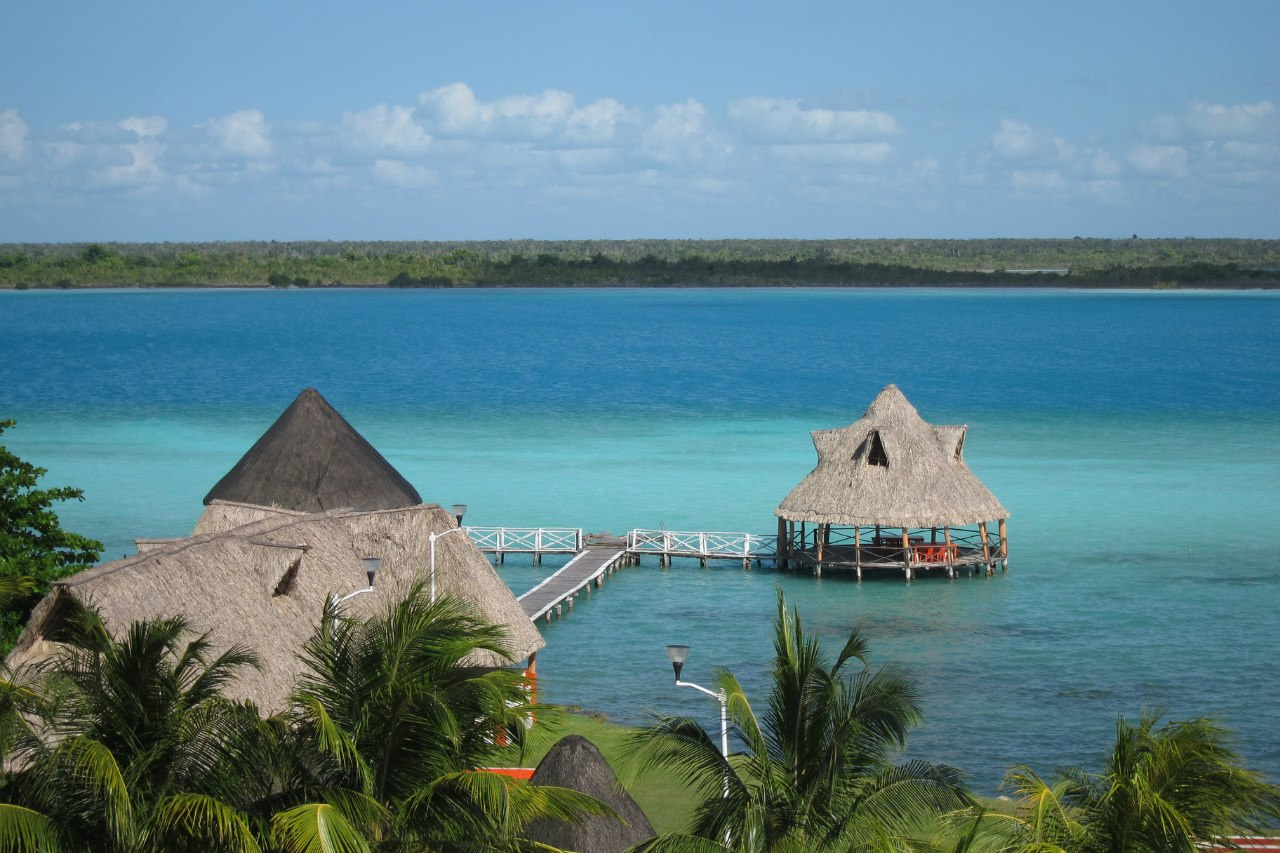
- Top: San Joaquín Church; Middle: Fortess of San Felipe, Chacchoben Archaeological Zone; Bottom: Cenote Azul, Lake Bacalar

- Coat of arms

- Location of Bacalar in Quintana Roo.
- Country: Mexico
- State: Quintana Roo
- Municipal seat and largest city: Bacalar
- Established: February 2, 2011

Government
  - Mayor: José Alfredo Contreras Méndez (MORENA)

Area
  - Total: 6,059 km^{2} (2,339 sq mi)

Population (2020)
  - Total: 41,754
  - Density: 6.891/km^{2} (17.85/sq mi)
  - Seat: 12,527
- Time zone: UTC−5 (Southeast (US Eastern))
- INEGI Code: 23010

Bacalar is one of the eleven municipalities of the Mexican state of Quintana Roo. The municipal seat and most populous town is the eponymous Bacalar. The municipality was formed on February 2, 2011, when it separated from the Municipality of Othón P. Blanco.

== Demographics ==
As 2020, Bacalar Municipality had a population of 41,754 inhabitants. Bacalar, the municipal seat, had a population of 12,527. Other localities include Limones (2,739 hab.), Maya Balam (2,675 hab.), Los Divorciados (1,249) and Reforma (1,213 hab.)

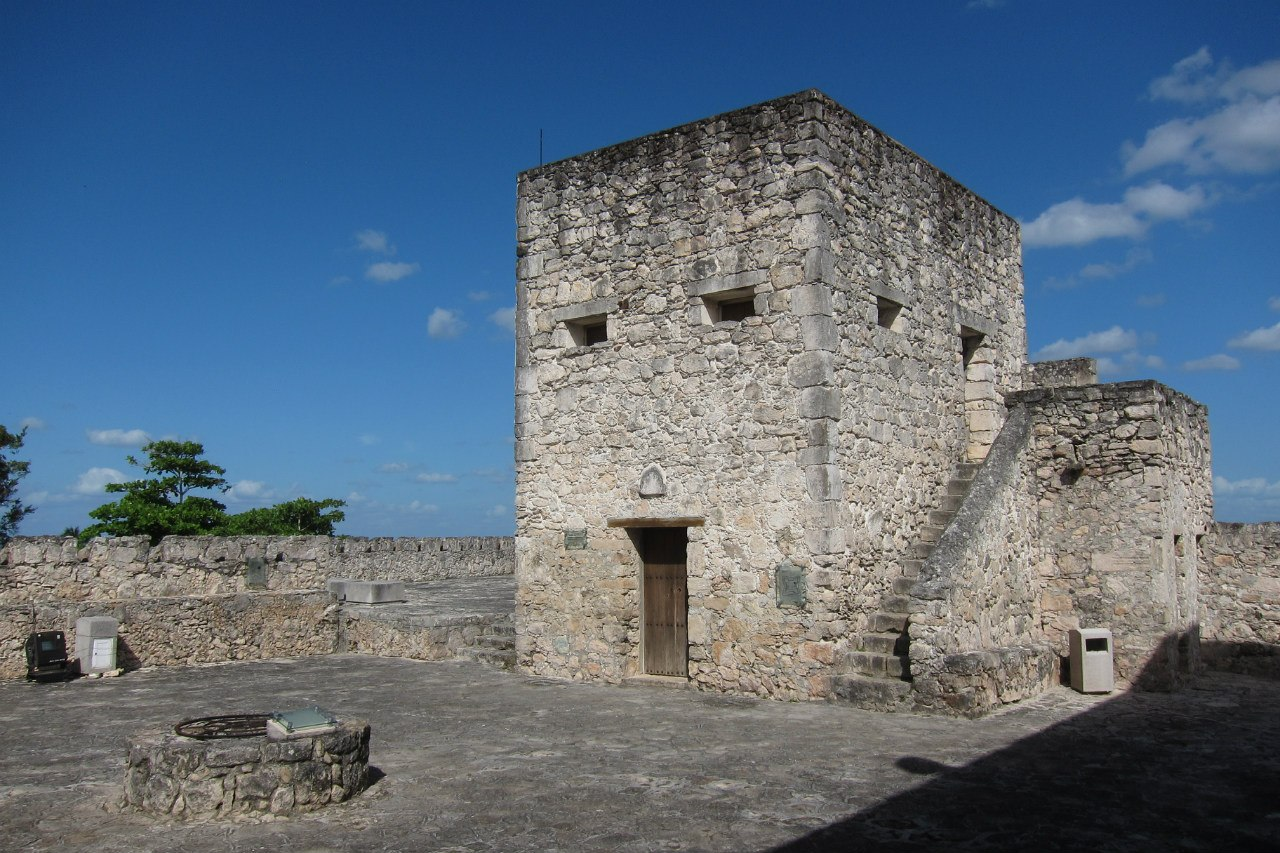
Bacalar Fort
