= Othón P. Blanco Núñez de Cáceres =

Mexican military official (1868–1959)

Othón Pompeyo Blanco Núñez de Cáceres
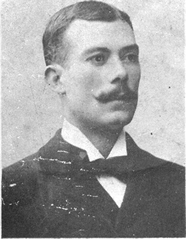

Undersecretary of the Mexican Navy
- In office 1941–1946

Personal details
- Born: March 7, 1868; Padilla, Tamaulipas, Mexico
- Died: October 18, 1959 (aged 91); Mexico City, Mexico

Othón Pompeyo Blanco Núñez de Cáceres (March 7, 1868 in Padilla, Tamaulipas – October 18, 1959 in Mexico City) was a Mexican Marine and the founder of the city of Chetumal who served as undersecretary of the Mexican Navy from 1941 to 1946.

The municipality of Othón P. Blanco, Quintana Roo, is named after him.
