= Guayabillo =

Guayabillo is the common name for a number of species of plant. It may refer to:

- Myrciaria ibarrae
- Psidium oligospermum
- Psidium guineense
- Psidium sartorianum
- Quararibea asterolepis
- Ginoria nudiflora
