= Othón P. Blanco, Quintana Roo =

Othón P. Blanco
- Municipality
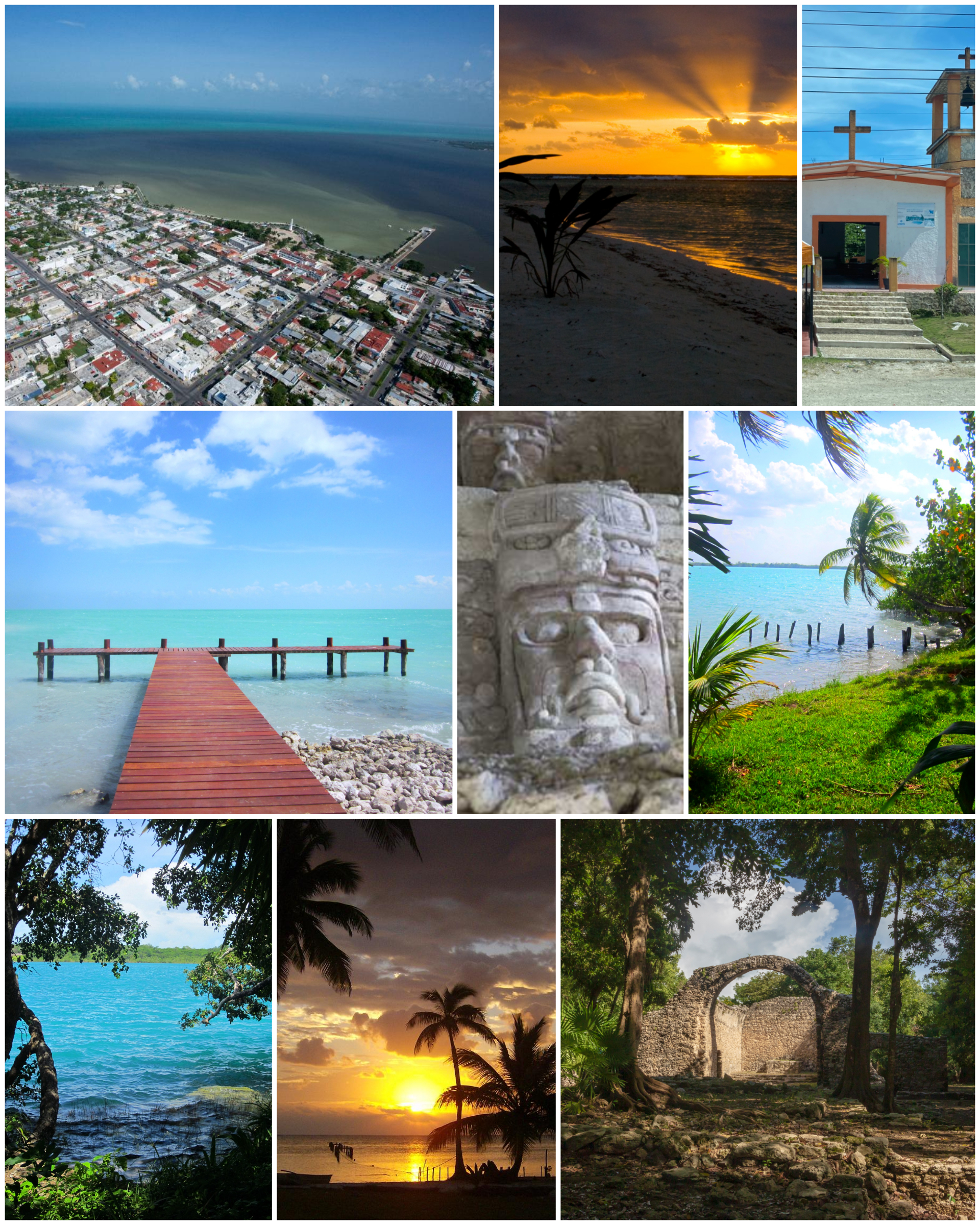
- Montage of the municipality

- Emblem

- Location of Othón P. Blanco in Quintana Roo

- Location within Mexico
- Coordinates: 18°30′N 88°18′W
- Country: Mexico
- State: Quintana Roo
- Founded: 12 January 1975
- Named for: Othón P. Blanco Núñez de Cáceres
- Municipal seat: Chetumal

Government
  - Municipal President: Eduardo Espinosa Abuxapqui

Area
  - Municipality: 10,028.65 km^{2} (3,872.08 sq mi)
- Elevation: 10 m (33 ft)

Population (2020 census)
  - Municipality: 233,648
  - Density: 23.2981/km^{2} (60.3417/sq mi)
  - Urban: 182,178
- Time zone: UTC–05:00 (Zona Sureste)
- INEGI Code: 23004
- Website: www.opb.gob.mx

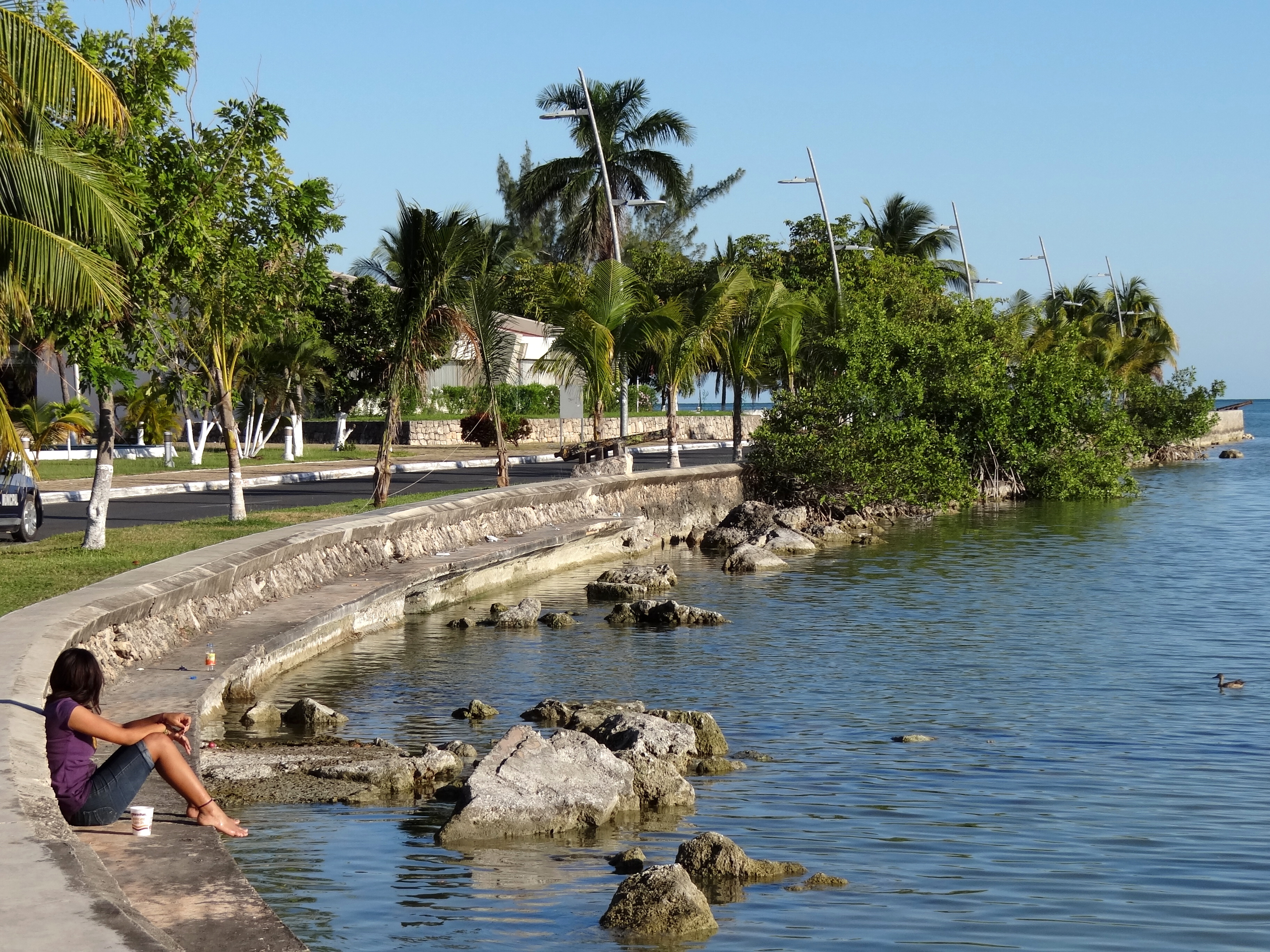
Boulevard de Bahía

Othón P. Blanco is one of the eleven subdivisions (municipios) of the Mexican state of Quintana Roo. It had a 2020 census population of 233,648 people. Its municipal seat is the city of Chetumal, which also serves as the state capital. The municipality is named after Othón P. Blanco Núñez de Cáceres.

The municipal government is headed by the municipal president of Othón P. Blanco (mayor of Othón P. Blanco, aka mayor of Chetumal).

It was formerly the fifth-largest municipality in land area in Mexico at 17,189.7 square kilometres (6,637.0 sq mi), occupying more than a third of the entire state. It lost about 40% of its territory when the Bacalar Municipality was created out of Othón P. Blanco on February 2, 2011.

== Communities ==
The 2010 census enumerated 727 populated localities plus 804 unpopulated localities. The largest localities (cities, towns, and villages) are listed below. In 2011, the municipality was split into two parts, with many of the localities now comprising part of the newly created Bacalar Municipality.

| Name | Population (2010 Census) |
|---|---|
| Chetumal | 151,243 |
| Calderitas | 5,326 |
| Nicolás Bravo | 4,011 |
| Javier Rojo Gómez | 2,911 |
| Álvaro Obregón | 2,869 |
| Sergio Butrón Casas | 2,235 |
| Cacao | 2,056 |
| Mahahual | 920 |
| Xul-Ha | 2,037 |
| Subteniente López | 1,915 |
| Pucté | 1,861 |
| Sacxán | 1,080 |
| Carlos A. Madrazo | 1,825 |
| Huay-Pix | 1,649 |
| Ucum | 1,676 |
| Tres Garantías | 790 |
| Xcalak | 375 |
| Total Municipality | 244,553 |

== Demographics ==
Historical population
| Year | Pop. | ±% p.a. |
|---|---|---|
| 1995 | 202,046 | — |
| 2000 | 208,164 | +0.60% |
| 2005 | 219,763 | +1.09% |
| 2010 | 244,553 | +2.16% |
Census numbers up to 2010 include population of Bacalar Municipality. Source: INEGI Instituto Nacional de Estadística y Geografía

== Archeological sites ==
- Dzibanché
- Kohunlich
- Oxtankah
- Chakanbakán
- Kinichná
- Ichkabal
- Zamora

== Ecosystems ==
The vegetation found in the municipality of Othon P. Blanco is mostly of medium forest, spanning most of the interior of the municipality and there are more representative plant species are the sapodilla, the ramon, the guayabillo and chaco, more isolated areas within the municipality is populated by high forest, where you can find the siricote, the palo de tinte and mahogany, to the southwest of the town are engaged in areas of rainfed agriculture and irrigation, the main crop of sugarcane, along with the Caribbean coast can be traced mainly mangroves.

The fauna is rich and varied, among the main species is the manatee, marine mammal that lives in bays and lagoons lictors and has become a symbol of the region, and one can find species such as agouti, wild boar, white-tailed deer, otters, turtles and birds.

For the protection of animal and plant species in Othon P. Blanco there are three zones of ecological reserve, the area of Protection of Flora and Fauna Uaymil located on the northeast coast of the territory, near Mahahual, and the Manatee Sanctuary in the Bay of Chetumal and the Biosphere Reserve Banco Chinchorro.

== Tourism ==
Located on the coast, the eco resort of Kabah-na offers only four cabins in a hexagon shape to circulate the air and thatched roofs which keep the interior temperature cool. A complex system of solar panels provides energy 24 hours a day as well as hot water. The resort offers restaurant, beach bar, outdoor showers, hammocks, beach volleyball, canoes, snorkeling equipment and more.

At Laguna de Bacalar is Rancho Encantado which is located on the edge of a lagoon. It consists of twelve cabins palm-thatched roofs, handmade furniture and decorated with Mexican accents. The cabins are surrounded by tropical gardens in which live more than 150 species of birds among the tropical fruit orchards.

== Gallery ==
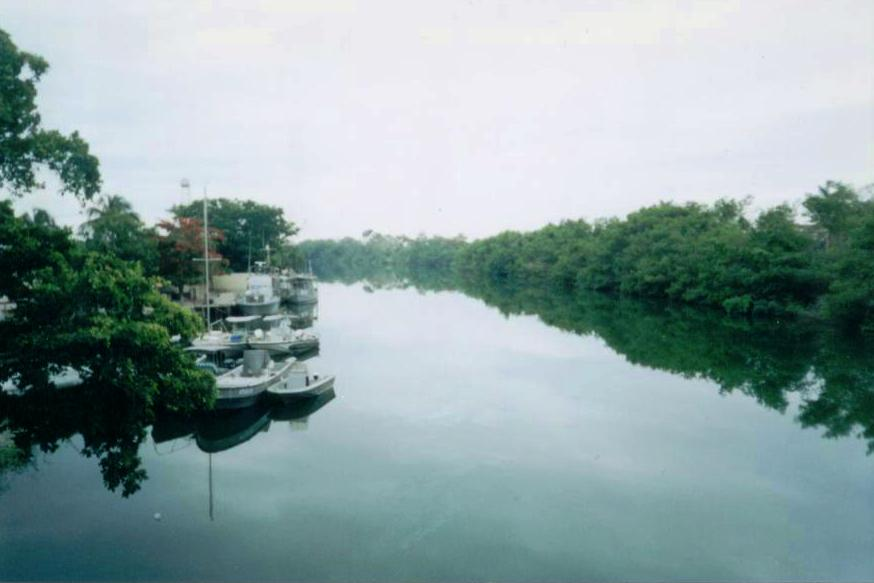
Río Hondo

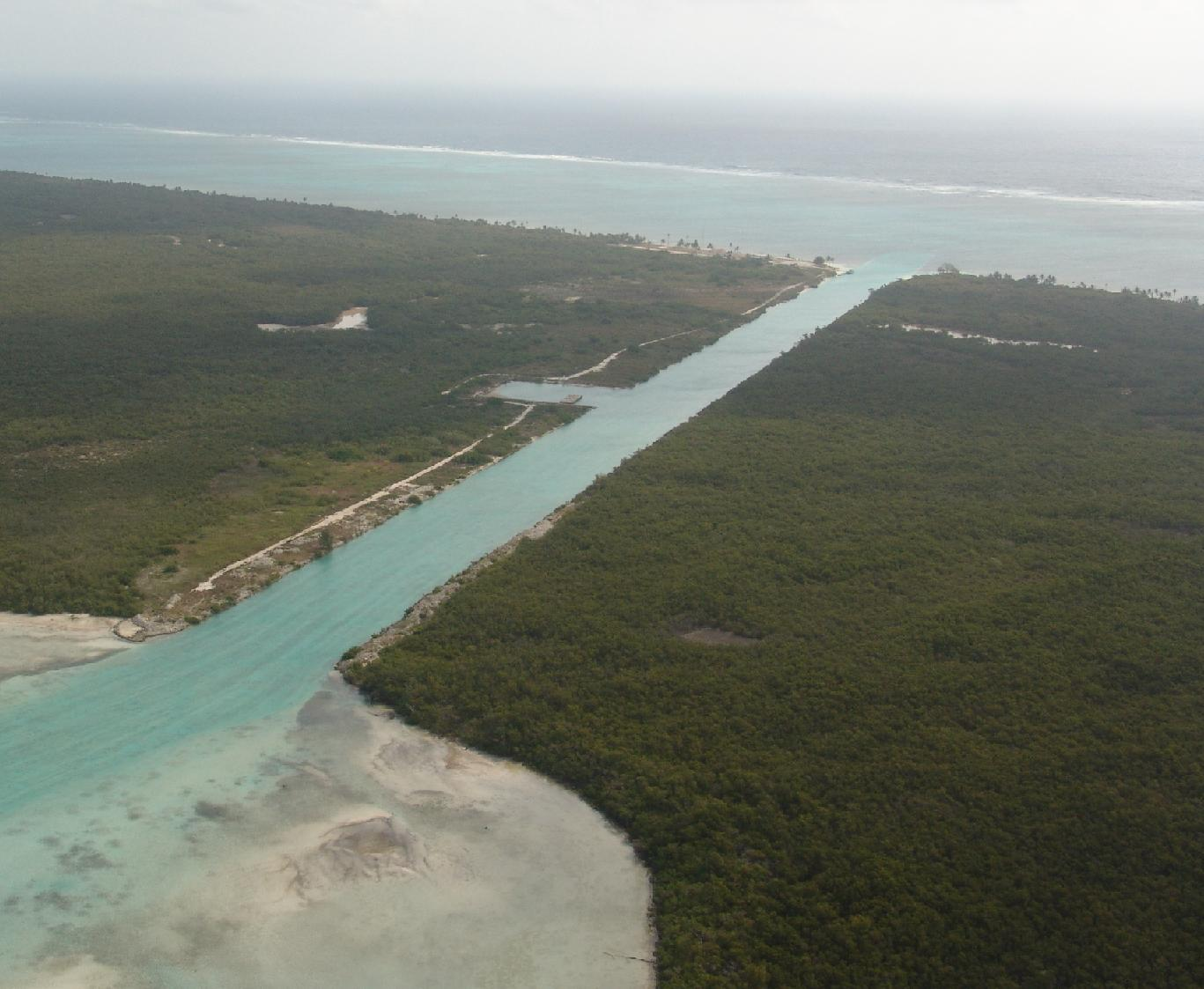
Aerial view of the Zaragoza Canal, the Bay of Chetumal and the Caribbean Sea

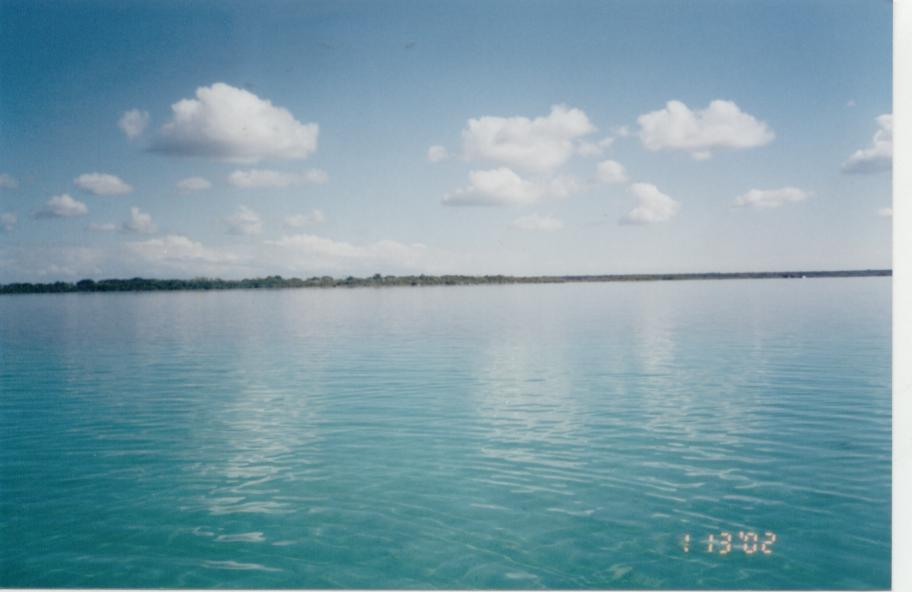
Bacalar Lagoon

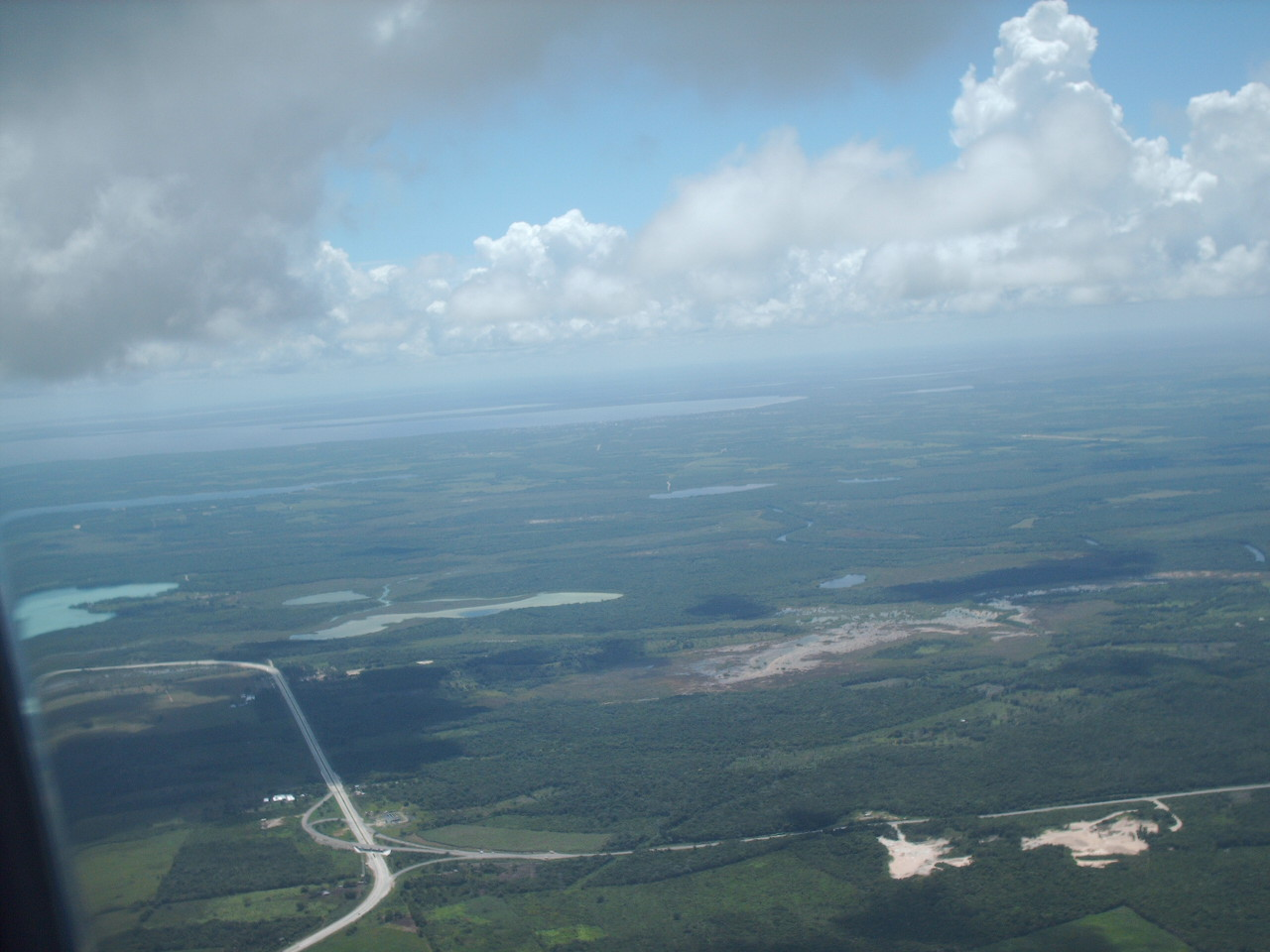
Junction of Highway 186 and 307 south of Laguna Bacalar
