= Obregon (surname) =

Obregón or Obregon is a Spanish surname. It originates from the village of Obregón in modern-day Cantabria, Spain.

Notable people with the surname include:

- Alejandro Obregón (1920-1992), Colombian painter, muralist, sculptor and engraver
- Alfonso Obregón (born 1972), former Ecuadorian football player
- Álvaro Obregón Salido (1880-1928), President of Mexico from 1920 to 1924
- Álvaro Obregón Tapia (1916-1993), Governor of Sonora, Mexico (1955–1961), son of president Álvaro Obregón Salido
- Ana Obregón (born 1955), Spanish actress, celebrity and socialite
- Brandon Obregón (born 1996), Argentine professional footballer
- Edgardo Obregón (born 1999), Mexican football prodigy
- Esteban Obregón (born 2001), Argentine professional footballer
- Eugene A. Obregon (1930-1950), United States Marine, posthumously awarded the Medal of Honor
- Josetxu Obregón, Spanish cellist
- Manuel Pareja Obregón (1933–1995), Spanish musician and composer
- Ricardo Obregón Cano (1917–2016), Argentine politician

== See also ==
- Obregon (disambiguation)
