= Le Tilleul-Othon =

- Part of Goupil-Othon
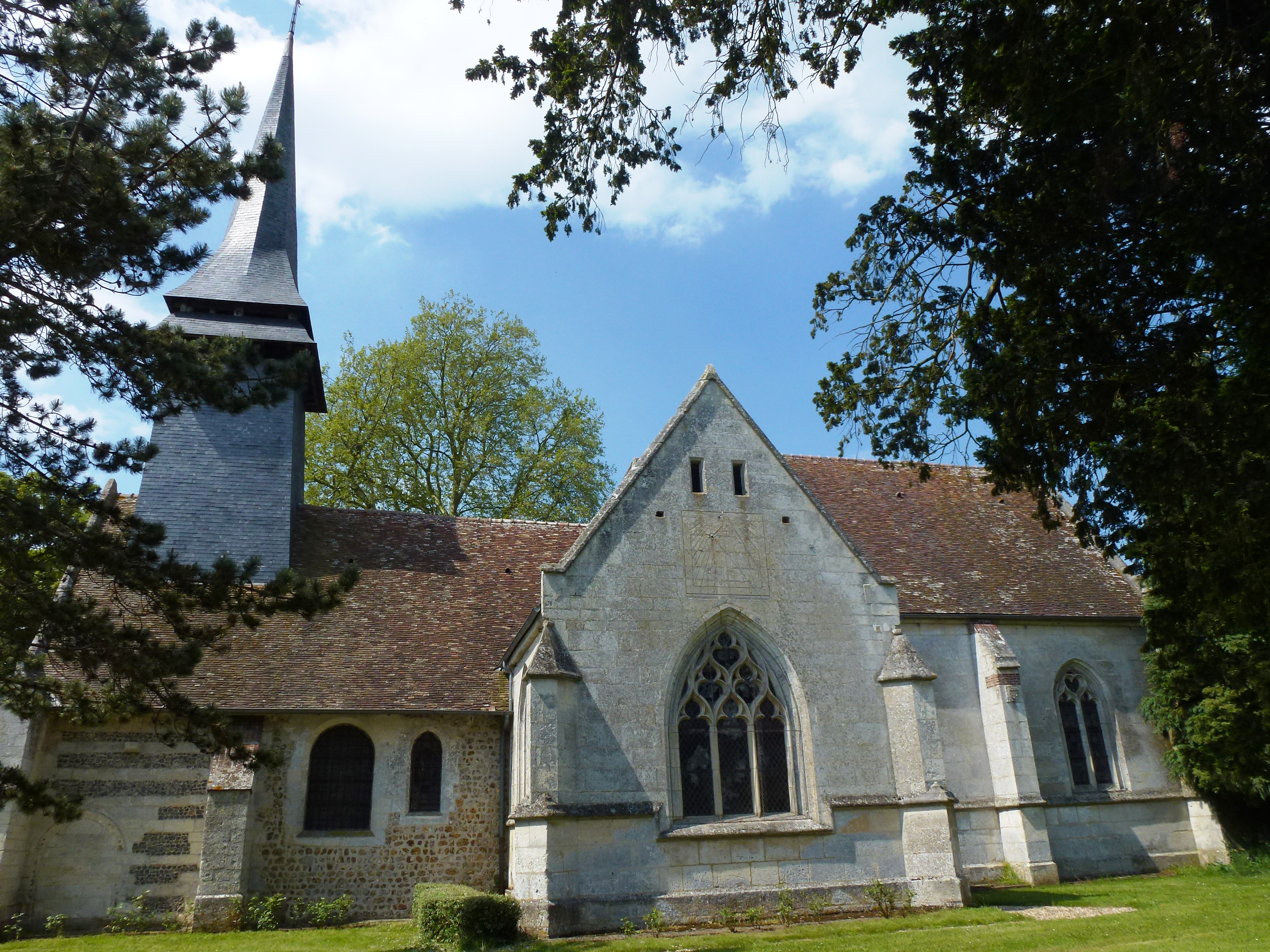

- Coat of arms
- Location of Le Tilleul-Othon
- Location within France Location within Normandy
- Coordinates: 49°06′56″N 0°47′29″E
- Country: France
- Region: Normandy
- Department: Eure
- Arrondissement: Bernay
- Canton: Brionne
- Commune: Goupil-Othon
- Area^{1}: 4.68 km^{2} (1.81 sq mi)
- Elevation: 146 m (479 ft)
- Highest elevation: 161 m (528 ft)
- Lowest elevation: 143 m (469 ft)
- Population (2018): 363
  - Density: 77.6/km^{2} (201/sq mi)
- Time zone: UTC+01:00 (CET)
  - Summer (DST): UTC+02:00 (CEST)
- Postal code: 27170
- ^{1} French Land Register data, which excludes lakes, ponds, glaciers > 1 km^{2} (0.386 sq mi or 247 acres) and river estuaries.

Le Tilleul-Othon (French pronunciation: [lə tijœl ɔtɔ̃]) is a former commune in the Eure department in Normandy in northern France. On 1 January 2018, it was merged into the new commune of Goupil-Othon.

== See also ==
- Communes of the Eure department
