= Municipalities of Quintana Roo =

List of municipalities of Mexican state

Map of Mexico with Quintana Roo highlighted

Quintana Roo is a state in southeast Mexico. It was established from the federal territory of Quintana Roo in 1974 with seven municipalities, which has since grown into eleven municipalities. According to the 2020 INEGI census, it has the twenty-fourth largest population of all states with 1,857,985 inhabitants and is the 19th largest by land area spanning 44,705.2 square kilometres (17,260.8 sq mi).

Municipalities in Quintana Roo are administratively autonomous of the state according to the 115th article of the 1917 Constitution of Mexico. Their legal framework derives from the state Constitution. Every three years, citizens elect a municipal president (Spanish: presidente municipal) by a plurality voting system. The president heads a concurrently elected municipal council (ayuntamiento) responsible for providing public services for their constituents. The municipal council consists of trustees and councillors (regidores y síndicos). Municipalities are responsible for public services (such as water and sewerage), street lighting, public safety, traffic, and the maintenance of public parks, gardens and cemeteries. They may also assist the state and federal governments in education, emergency fire and medical services, environmental protection and maintenance of monuments and historical landmarks. Since 1984, they have had the power to collect property taxes and user fees, although more funds are obtained from the state and federal governments than locally.

As of 2020, the largest municipality by population is Benito Juárez with 911,503 residents while the smallest is Isla Mujeres with 22,686 residents. The largest municipality by land area is Felipe Carrillo Puerto which spans 12,939.30 km^{2} (4,995.89 sq mi), and the smallest is Cozumel with 488.00 km^{2} (188.42 sq mi). The newest municipality is Puerto Morelos which was created out of Benito Juárez in 2016.

== Municipalities ==
Map of municipalities of Quintana Roo. 1: Cozumel. 2: Felipe Carrillo Puerto. 3: Isla Mujeres. 4: Othón P. Blanco. 5: Benito Juárez. 6: José María Morelos. 7: Lázaro Cárdenas. 8: Solidaridad. 9: Tulum. 10: Bacalar. 11: Puerto Morelos.

Largest municipalities in Quintana Roo by population

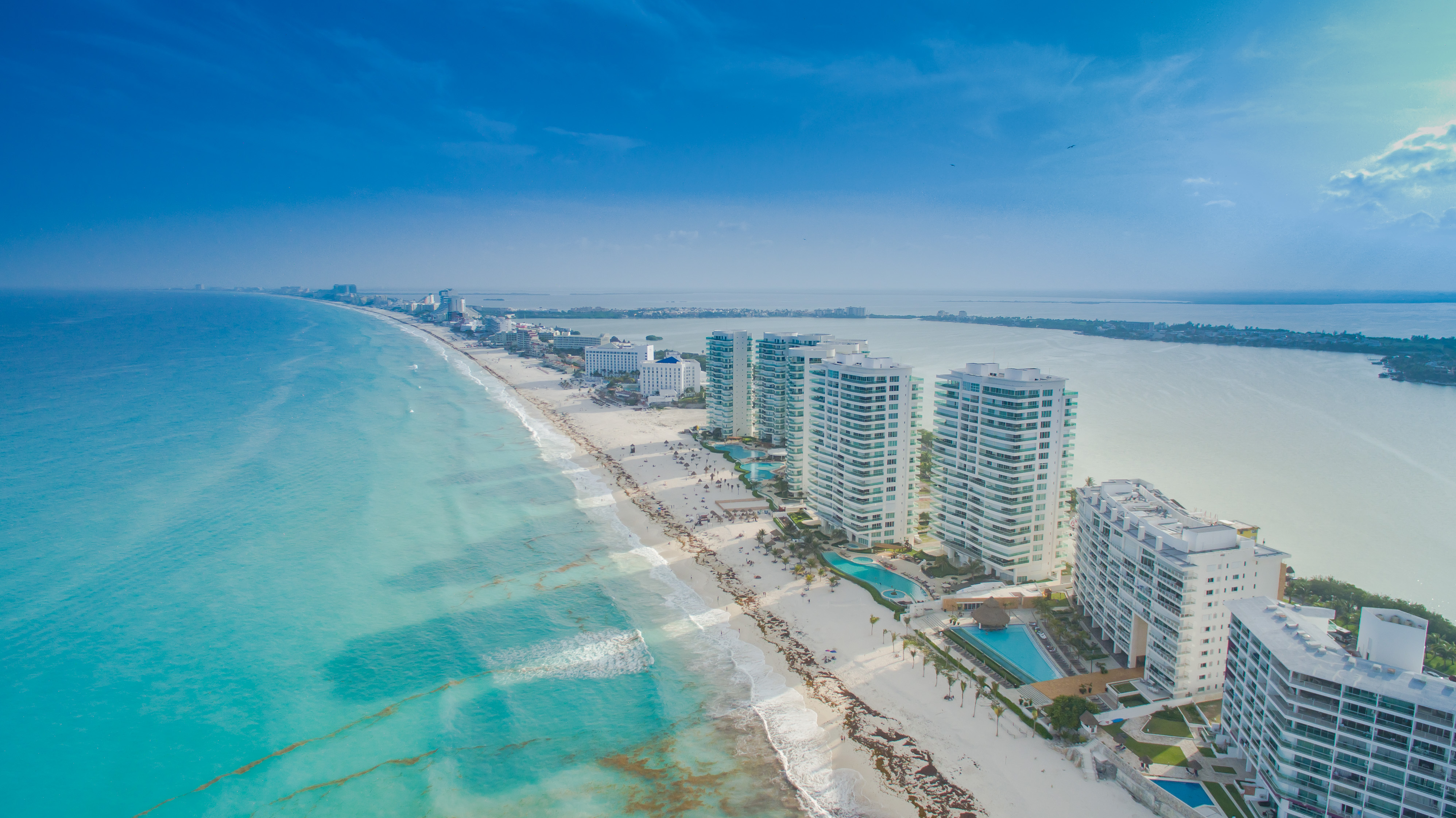
Benito Juárez, the municipality containing Cancún, is the largest municipality by population in Quintana Roo.

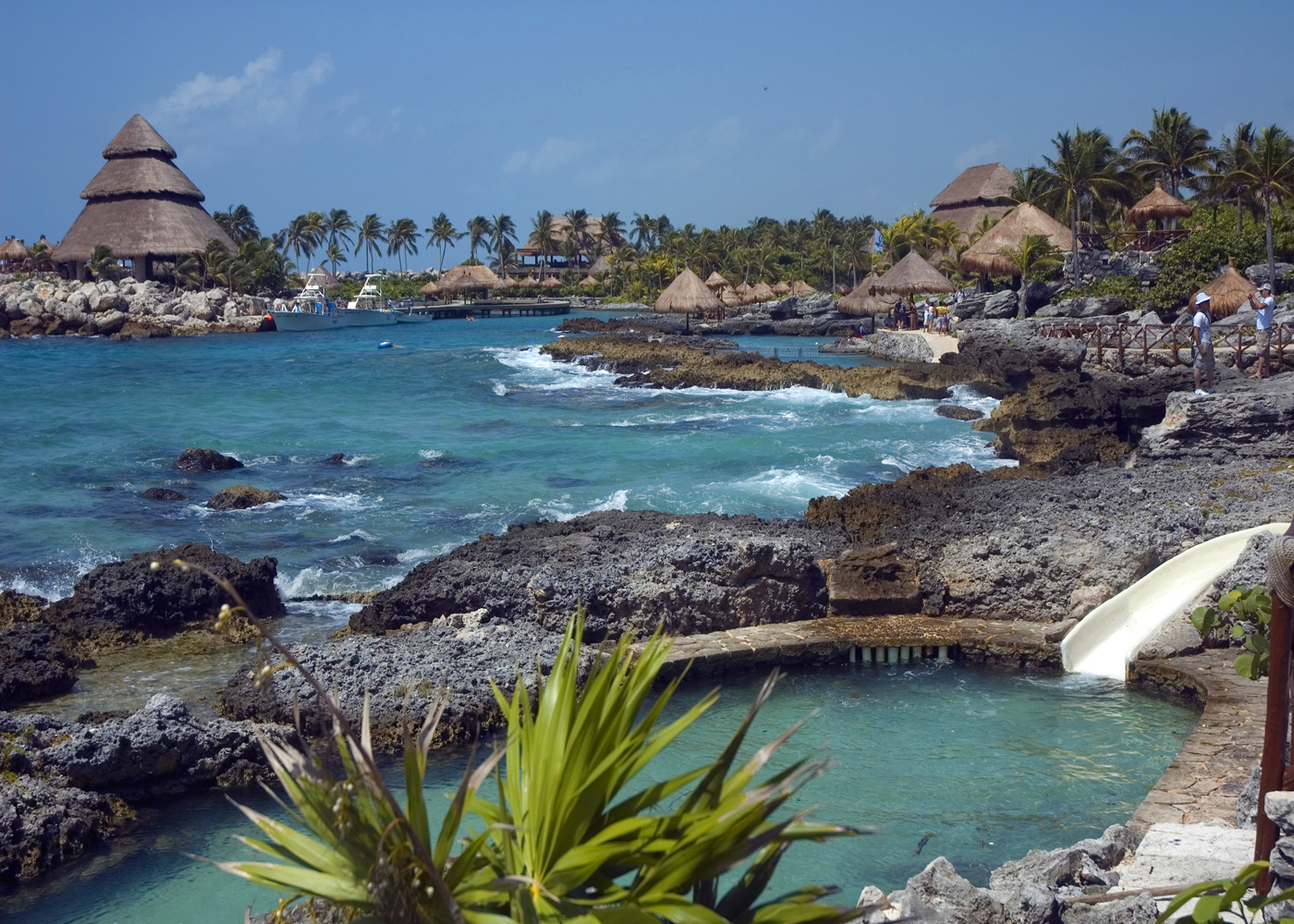
Solidaridad, second largest municipality by population

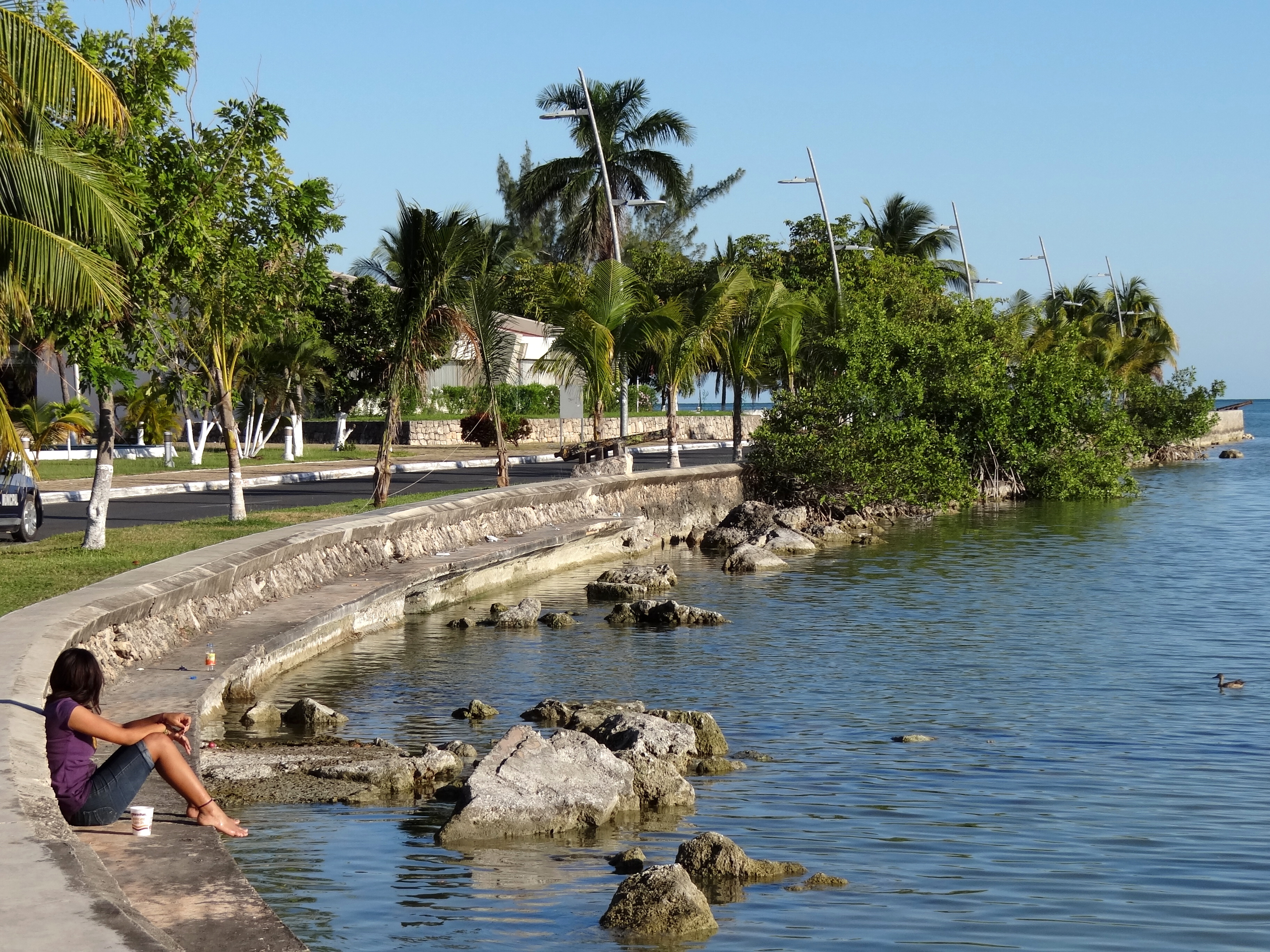
Othón P. Blanco is the third largest municipality by population and contains the state capital.

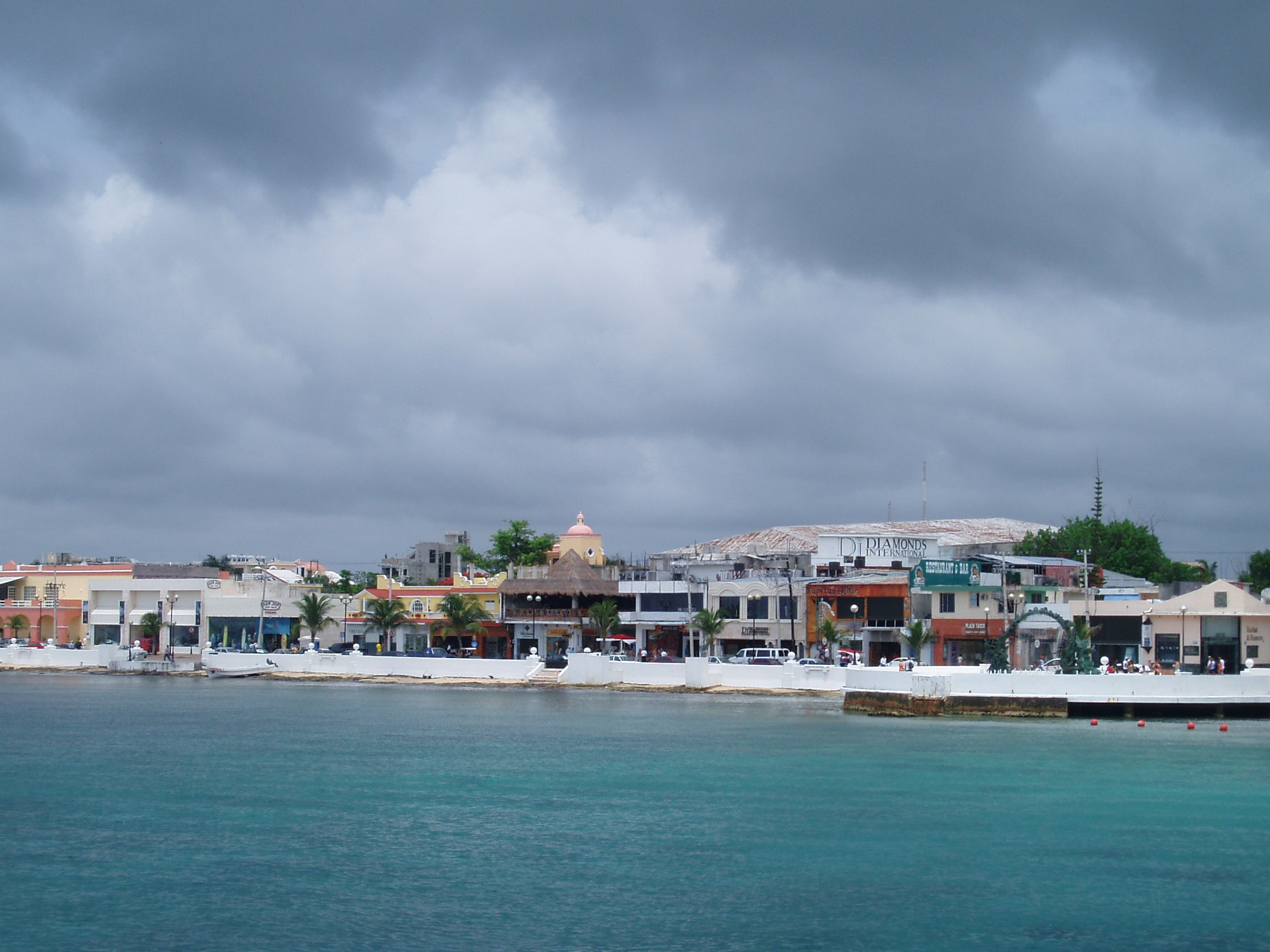
Cozumel is the fourth largest municipality by population.

† State capital

Municipalities of Quintana Roo
Name	Municipal seat	Population (2020)	Population (2010)	Change	Land area		Population density (2020)	Incorporation date
Name	Municipal seat	Population (2020)	Population (2010)	Change	km^{2}	sq mi	Population density (2020)	Incorporation date
Bacalar (Note: Bacalar previously existed as a municipality from 1825 to 1929 and was recreated in 2011 from the territory of Othón P. Blanco.)	Bacalar	41,754	—	—	6,058.5	2,339.2	6.9/km^{2} (17.8/sq mi)	February 2, 2011
Benito Juárez	Cancún	911,503	661,176	+37.9%	930.7	359.3	979.4/km^{2} (2,536.6/sq mi)	January 12, 1975
Cozumel	San Miguel de Cozumel	88,626	79,535	+11.4%	488.0	188.4	181.6/km^{2} (470.4/sq mi)	April 21, 1862
Felipe Carrillo Puerto (Note: Felipe Carrilo Puerto was originally incorporated as Santa Cruz, changing its name on August 1, 1934.)	Felipe Carrillo Puerto	83,990	75,026	+11.9%	12,938.3	4,995.5	6.5/km^{2} (16.8/sq mi)	February 27, 1904
Isla Mujeres	Isla Mujeres	22,686	16,203	+40.0%	862.5	333.0	26.3/km^{2} (68.1/sq mi)	July 24, 1867
José María Morelos	José María Morelos	39,165	36,179	+8.3%	4,850.0	1,872.6	8.1/km^{2} (20.9/sq mi)	January 12, 1975
Lázaro Cárdenas	Kantunilkín	29,171	25,333	+15.2%	3,593.3	1,387.4	8.1/km^{2} (21.0/sq mi)	January 12, 1975
Othón P. Blanco (Note: Othón P. Blanco was originally incorporated as Payo Obispo, changing its name on January 12, 1975.)	Chetumal†	233,648	244,553	−4.5%	9,909.8	3,826.2	23.6/km^{2} (61.1/sq mi)	February 27, 1904
Puerto Morelos	Puerto Morelos	26,921	—	—	1,040.5	401.7	25.9/km^{2} (67.0/sq mi)	January 6, 2016
Solidaridad	Playa del Carmen	333,800	159,310	+109.5%	2,014.9	778.0	165.7/km^{2} (429.1/sq mi)	July 28, 1993
Tulum	Tulum	46,721	28,263	+65.3%	2,018.6	779.4	23.1/km^{2} (59.9/sq mi)	March 13, 2008
Quintana Roo	—	1,857,985	1,325,578	+40.2%	44,705.2	17,260.8	41.6/km^{2} (107.6/sq mi)	—
Mexico	—	126,014,024	112,336,538	+12.2%	1,960,646.7	757,010	64.3/km^{2} (166.5/sq mi)	—
